

380001–380100 

|-bgcolor=#E9E9E9
| 380001 ||  || — || November 17, 2007 || Catalina || CSS || — || align=right | 1.5 km || 
|-id=002 bgcolor=#d6d6d6
| 380002 ||  || — || February 12, 2008 || Kitt Peak || Spacewatch || — || align=right | 2.3 km || 
|-id=003 bgcolor=#d6d6d6
| 380003 ||  || — || January 27, 2007 || Kitt Peak || Spacewatch || KOR || align=right | 1.4 km || 
|-id=004 bgcolor=#fefefe
| 380004 ||  || — || March 24, 2003 || Kitt Peak || Spacewatch || — || align=right data-sort-value="0.71" | 710 m || 
|-id=005 bgcolor=#d6d6d6
| 380005 ||  || — || February 10, 2002 || Socorro || LINEAR || EOS || align=right | 2.2 km || 
|-id=006 bgcolor=#E9E9E9
| 380006 ||  || — || January 16, 2008 || Mount Lemmon || Mount Lemmon Survey || — || align=right | 1.5 km || 
|-id=007 bgcolor=#fefefe
| 380007 ||  || — || March 27, 2003 || Kitt Peak || Spacewatch || — || align=right data-sort-value="0.85" | 850 m || 
|-id=008 bgcolor=#FA8072
| 380008 ||  || — || March 7, 2009 || Mount Lemmon || Mount Lemmon Survey || — || align=right | 1.3 km || 
|-id=009 bgcolor=#d6d6d6
| 380009 ||  || — || November 4, 2004 || Kitt Peak || Spacewatch || — || align=right | 2.7 km || 
|-id=010 bgcolor=#E9E9E9
| 380010 ||  || — || October 29, 2005 || Catalina || CSS || ADE || align=right | 2.6 km || 
|-id=011 bgcolor=#E9E9E9
| 380011 ||  || — || February 21, 2007 || Mount Lemmon || Mount Lemmon Survey || GEF || align=right | 1.5 km || 
|-id=012 bgcolor=#fefefe
| 380012 ||  || — || September 24, 1960 || Palomar || PLS || MAS || align=right data-sort-value="0.88" | 880 m || 
|-id=013 bgcolor=#E9E9E9
| 380013 ||  || — || March 10, 2008 || Kitt Peak || Spacewatch || — || align=right | 1.1 km || 
|-id=014 bgcolor=#E9E9E9
| 380014 ||  || — || January 12, 2002 || Kitt Peak || Spacewatch || — || align=right | 2.2 km || 
|-id=015 bgcolor=#d6d6d6
| 380015 ||  || — || November 20, 2003 || Kitt Peak || Spacewatch || — || align=right | 3.6 km || 
|-id=016 bgcolor=#E9E9E9
| 380016 ||  || — || October 7, 2004 || Anderson Mesa || LONEOS || — || align=right | 3.1 km || 
|-id=017 bgcolor=#E9E9E9
| 380017 ||  || — || July 5, 2000 || Anderson Mesa || LONEOS || JUN || align=right | 1.2 km || 
|-id=018 bgcolor=#fefefe
| 380018 ||  || — || July 21, 2006 || Mount Lemmon || Mount Lemmon Survey || NYS || align=right data-sort-value="0.81" | 810 m || 
|-id=019 bgcolor=#fefefe
| 380019 ||  || — || April 16, 2005 || Kitt Peak || Spacewatch || NYS || align=right data-sort-value="0.73" | 730 m || 
|-id=020 bgcolor=#E9E9E9
| 380020 ||  || — || October 9, 2004 || Anderson Mesa || LONEOS || — || align=right | 2.6 km || 
|-id=021 bgcolor=#E9E9E9
| 380021 ||  || — || November 10, 2009 || Catalina || CSS || — || align=right | 1.0 km || 
|-id=022 bgcolor=#E9E9E9
| 380022 ||  || — || May 13, 2008 || Mount Lemmon || Mount Lemmon Survey || — || align=right | 2.2 km || 
|-id=023 bgcolor=#E9E9E9
| 380023 ||  || — || September 16, 2001 || Socorro || LINEAR || — || align=right data-sort-value="0.91" | 910 m || 
|-id=024 bgcolor=#d6d6d6
| 380024 ||  || — || February 16, 2010 || Mount Lemmon || Mount Lemmon Survey || 7:4 || align=right | 4.9 km || 
|-id=025 bgcolor=#E9E9E9
| 380025 ||  || — || January 2, 2011 || Mount Lemmon || Mount Lemmon Survey || MRX || align=right | 1.2 km || 
|-id=026 bgcolor=#fefefe
| 380026 ||  || — || October 20, 2003 || Socorro || LINEAR || FLO || align=right data-sort-value="0.63" | 630 m || 
|-id=027 bgcolor=#d6d6d6
| 380027 ||  || — || November 23, 2003 || Kitt Peak || Spacewatch || VER || align=right | 3.7 km || 
|-id=028 bgcolor=#E9E9E9
| 380028 ||  || — || October 26, 2009 || Mount Lemmon || Mount Lemmon Survey || — || align=right | 2.7 km || 
|-id=029 bgcolor=#fefefe
| 380029 ||  || — || December 19, 2004 || Mount Lemmon || Mount Lemmon Survey || — || align=right data-sort-value="0.97" | 970 m || 
|-id=030 bgcolor=#fefefe
| 380030 ||  || — || April 24, 2001 || Kitt Peak || Spacewatch || NYS || align=right data-sort-value="0.90" | 900 m || 
|-id=031 bgcolor=#fefefe
| 380031 ||  || — || November 24, 2006 || Mount Lemmon || Mount Lemmon Survey || MAS || align=right | 1.0 km || 
|-id=032 bgcolor=#E9E9E9
| 380032 ||  || — || November 22, 2009 || Catalina || CSS || — || align=right | 3.6 km || 
|-id=033 bgcolor=#d6d6d6
| 380033 ||  || — || September 5, 2007 || Mount Lemmon || Mount Lemmon Survey || — || align=right | 3.4 km || 
|-id=034 bgcolor=#fefefe
| 380034 ||  || — || February 21, 2001 || Kitt Peak || Spacewatch || — || align=right data-sort-value="0.99" | 990 m || 
|-id=035 bgcolor=#E9E9E9
| 380035 ||  || — || May 3, 2008 || Mount Lemmon || Mount Lemmon Survey || — || align=right | 1.5 km || 
|-id=036 bgcolor=#d6d6d6
| 380036 ||  || — || November 9, 2008 || Mount Lemmon || Mount Lemmon Survey || — || align=right | 3.7 km || 
|-id=037 bgcolor=#fefefe
| 380037 ||  || — || February 17, 2004 || Kitt Peak || Spacewatch || — || align=right | 1.2 km || 
|-id=038 bgcolor=#E9E9E9
| 380038 ||  || — || April 22, 2007 || Mount Lemmon || Mount Lemmon Survey || BRU || align=right | 4.8 km || 
|-id=039 bgcolor=#fefefe
| 380039 ||  || — || April 2, 2005 || Mount Lemmon || Mount Lemmon Survey || FLO || align=right data-sort-value="0.66" | 660 m || 
|-id=040 bgcolor=#d6d6d6
| 380040 ||  || — || December 9, 2004 || Kitt Peak || Spacewatch || — || align=right | 3.2 km || 
|-id=041 bgcolor=#fefefe
| 380041 ||  || — || January 11, 2008 || Mount Lemmon || Mount Lemmon Survey || V || align=right data-sort-value="0.87" | 870 m || 
|-id=042 bgcolor=#fefefe
| 380042 ||  || — || September 14, 1998 || Kitt Peak || Spacewatch || NYS || align=right data-sort-value="0.87" | 870 m || 
|-id=043 bgcolor=#fefefe
| 380043 ||  || — || March 18, 2004 || Socorro || LINEAR || H || align=right data-sort-value="0.55" | 550 m || 
|-id=044 bgcolor=#E9E9E9
| 380044 ||  || — || October 9, 2004 || Kitt Peak || Spacewatch || — || align=right | 2.5 km || 
|-id=045 bgcolor=#fefefe
| 380045 ||  || — || August 28, 2006 || Catalina || CSS || V || align=right data-sort-value="0.51" | 510 m || 
|-id=046 bgcolor=#fefefe
| 380046 ||  || — || July 24, 1993 || Kitt Peak || Spacewatch || — || align=right | 1.4 km || 
|-id=047 bgcolor=#fefefe
| 380047 ||  || — || December 5, 2007 || Kitt Peak || Spacewatch || FLO || align=right data-sort-value="0.64" | 640 m || 
|-id=048 bgcolor=#E9E9E9
| 380048 ||  || — || October 7, 2004 || Kitt Peak || Spacewatch || MRX || align=right | 1.2 km || 
|-id=049 bgcolor=#E9E9E9
| 380049 ||  || — || September 11, 2005 || Kitt Peak || Spacewatch || — || align=right data-sort-value="0.83" | 830 m || 
|-id=050 bgcolor=#d6d6d6
| 380050 ||  || — || December 22, 2003 || Socorro || LINEAR || — || align=right | 3.9 km || 
|-id=051 bgcolor=#E9E9E9
| 380051 ||  || — || October 27, 2005 || Mount Lemmon || Mount Lemmon Survey || — || align=right data-sort-value="0.96" | 960 m || 
|-id=052 bgcolor=#E9E9E9
| 380052 ||  || — || April 29, 2003 || Kitt Peak || Spacewatch || MAR || align=right | 1.4 km || 
|-id=053 bgcolor=#d6d6d6
| 380053 ||  || — || January 6, 2010 || Kitt Peak || Spacewatch || — || align=right | 4.9 km || 
|-id=054 bgcolor=#E9E9E9
| 380054 ||  || — || March 25, 2004 || Siding Spring || SSS || — || align=right | 3.1 km || 
|-id=055 bgcolor=#d6d6d6
| 380055 ||  || — || August 22, 2003 || Campo Imperatore || CINEOS || TRP || align=right | 2.7 km || 
|-id=056 bgcolor=#E9E9E9
| 380056 ||  || — || October 2, 1999 || Kitt Peak || Spacewatch || HOF || align=right | 2.5 km || 
|-id=057 bgcolor=#d6d6d6
| 380057 ||  || — || October 1, 1999 || Kitt Peak || Spacewatch || KOR || align=right | 1.6 km || 
|-id=058 bgcolor=#E9E9E9
| 380058 ||  || — || November 24, 2009 || Catalina || CSS || — || align=right | 2.6 km || 
|-id=059 bgcolor=#fefefe
| 380059 ||  || — || December 16, 2007 || Mount Lemmon || Mount Lemmon Survey || — || align=right data-sort-value="0.77" | 770 m || 
|-id=060 bgcolor=#d6d6d6
| 380060 ||  || — || October 22, 2008 || Kitt Peak || Spacewatch || — || align=right | 2.9 km || 
|-id=061 bgcolor=#d6d6d6
| 380061 ||  || — || March 8, 2005 || Mount Lemmon || Mount Lemmon Survey || — || align=right | 4.3 km || 
|-id=062 bgcolor=#E9E9E9
| 380062 ||  || — || October 30, 2000 || Socorro || LINEAR || — || align=right | 1.9 km || 
|-id=063 bgcolor=#d6d6d6
| 380063 ||  || — || December 9, 2004 || Kitt Peak || Spacewatch || KOR || align=right | 1.5 km || 
|-id=064 bgcolor=#d6d6d6
| 380064 ||  || — || June 16, 2007 || Kitt Peak || Spacewatch || — || align=right | 3.2 km || 
|-id=065 bgcolor=#E9E9E9
| 380065 ||  || — || March 14, 2007 || Kitt Peak || Spacewatch || — || align=right | 2.0 km || 
|-id=066 bgcolor=#E9E9E9
| 380066 ||  || — || October 5, 1996 || Kitt Peak || Spacewatch || — || align=right | 1.3 km || 
|-id=067 bgcolor=#E9E9E9
| 380067 ||  || — || November 29, 2000 || Kitt Peak || Spacewatch || WIT || align=right | 1.2 km || 
|-id=068 bgcolor=#d6d6d6
| 380068 ||  || — || April 4, 2005 || Catalina || CSS || — || align=right | 5.1 km || 
|-id=069 bgcolor=#E9E9E9
| 380069 ||  || — || October 14, 2001 || Socorro || LINEAR || MAR || align=right | 1.4 km || 
|-id=070 bgcolor=#E9E9E9
| 380070 ||  || — || January 11, 2002 || Anderson Mesa || LONEOS || ADE || align=right | 3.1 km || 
|-id=071 bgcolor=#E9E9E9
| 380071 ||  || — || February 3, 2006 || Mount Lemmon || Mount Lemmon Survey || HEN || align=right | 1.3 km || 
|-id=072 bgcolor=#E9E9E9
| 380072 ||  || — || December 27, 2005 || Mount Lemmon || Mount Lemmon Survey || — || align=right | 1.1 km || 
|-id=073 bgcolor=#E9E9E9
| 380073 ||  || — || May 27, 2008 || Mount Lemmon || Mount Lemmon Survey || — || align=right | 1.6 km || 
|-id=074 bgcolor=#E9E9E9
| 380074 ||  || — || November 17, 2009 || Kitt Peak || Spacewatch || JUN || align=right | 1.1 km || 
|-id=075 bgcolor=#fefefe
| 380075 ||  || — || April 7, 2008 || Kitt Peak || Spacewatch || — || align=right | 1.1 km || 
|-id=076 bgcolor=#d6d6d6
| 380076 ||  || — || November 8, 2008 || Mount Lemmon || Mount Lemmon Survey || EOS || align=right | 2.5 km || 
|-id=077 bgcolor=#E9E9E9
| 380077 ||  || — || September 11, 2004 || Kitt Peak || Spacewatch || — || align=right | 2.1 km || 
|-id=078 bgcolor=#fefefe
| 380078 ||  || — || February 3, 2000 || Kitt Peak || Spacewatch || — || align=right data-sort-value="0.94" | 940 m || 
|-id=079 bgcolor=#E9E9E9
| 380079 ||  || — || October 22, 2005 || Kitt Peak || Spacewatch || — || align=right data-sort-value="0.98" | 980 m || 
|-id=080 bgcolor=#fefefe
| 380080 ||  || — || September 28, 2006 || Catalina || CSS || PHO || align=right | 1.1 km || 
|-id=081 bgcolor=#fefefe
| 380081 ||  || — || October 31, 2000 || Socorro || LINEAR || H || align=right data-sort-value="0.80" | 800 m || 
|-id=082 bgcolor=#E9E9E9
| 380082 ||  || — || August 31, 2000 || Socorro || LINEAR || — || align=right | 1.4 km || 
|-id=083 bgcolor=#d6d6d6
| 380083 ||  || — || October 5, 1996 || Kitt Peak || Spacewatch || — || align=right | 3.7 km || 
|-id=084 bgcolor=#E9E9E9
| 380084 ||  || — || November 23, 2009 || Kitt Peak || Spacewatch || — || align=right | 2.8 km || 
|-id=085 bgcolor=#d6d6d6
| 380085 ||  || — || February 27, 2006 || Kitt Peak || Spacewatch || KOR || align=right | 1.6 km || 
|-id=086 bgcolor=#E9E9E9
| 380086 ||  || — || March 10, 2002 || Kitt Peak || Spacewatch || GEF || align=right | 1.3 km || 
|-id=087 bgcolor=#E9E9E9
| 380087 ||  || — || March 13, 2007 || Mount Lemmon || Mount Lemmon Survey || — || align=right | 1.1 km || 
|-id=088 bgcolor=#fefefe
| 380088 ||  || — || November 8, 2007 || Mount Lemmon || Mount Lemmon Survey || — || align=right data-sort-value="0.76" | 760 m || 
|-id=089 bgcolor=#E9E9E9
| 380089 ||  || — || March 25, 2007 || Mount Lemmon || Mount Lemmon Survey || — || align=right | 1.9 km || 
|-id=090 bgcolor=#fefefe
| 380090 ||  || — || November 8, 2007 || Kitt Peak || Spacewatch || FLO || align=right data-sort-value="0.57" | 570 m || 
|-id=091 bgcolor=#FA8072
| 380091 ||  || — || October 11, 1977 || Palomar || PLS || — || align=right data-sort-value="0.71" | 710 m || 
|-id=092 bgcolor=#fefefe
| 380092 ||  || — || December 5, 2002 || Socorro || LINEAR || — || align=right | 1.0 km || 
|-id=093 bgcolor=#d6d6d6
| 380093 ||  || — || April 25, 2007 || Kitt Peak || Spacewatch || — || align=right | 2.7 km || 
|-id=094 bgcolor=#E9E9E9
| 380094 ||  || — || December 2, 2005 || Mount Lemmon || Mount Lemmon Survey || — || align=right | 3.1 km || 
|-id=095 bgcolor=#E9E9E9
| 380095 ||  || — || September 15, 2004 || Kitt Peak || Spacewatch || — || align=right | 2.1 km || 
|-id=096 bgcolor=#fefefe
| 380096 ||  || — || April 11, 2008 || Mount Lemmon || Mount Lemmon Survey || — || align=right data-sort-value="0.94" | 940 m || 
|-id=097 bgcolor=#d6d6d6
| 380097 ||  || — || November 3, 2008 || Mount Lemmon || Mount Lemmon Survey || — || align=right | 5.1 km || 
|-id=098 bgcolor=#d6d6d6
| 380098 ||  || — || November 7, 2008 || Mount Lemmon || Mount Lemmon Survey || — || align=right | 3.9 km || 
|-id=099 bgcolor=#E9E9E9
| 380099 ||  || — || September 24, 2000 || Anderson Mesa || LONEOS || — || align=right | 1.4 km || 
|-id=100 bgcolor=#fefefe
| 380100 ||  || — || February 4, 2000 || Kitt Peak || Spacewatch || NYS || align=right data-sort-value="0.79" | 790 m || 
|}

380101–380200 

|-bgcolor=#E9E9E9
| 380101 ||  || — || December 25, 2000 || Kitt Peak || Spacewatch || HOF || align=right | 4.3 km || 
|-id=102 bgcolor=#E9E9E9
| 380102 ||  || — || September 18, 2004 || Socorro || LINEAR || — || align=right | 2.6 km || 
|-id=103 bgcolor=#fefefe
| 380103 ||  || — || March 19, 2004 || Socorro || LINEAR || H || align=right data-sort-value="0.84" | 840 m || 
|-id=104 bgcolor=#d6d6d6
| 380104 ||  || — || April 30, 2006 || Kitt Peak || Spacewatch || — || align=right | 3.1 km || 
|-id=105 bgcolor=#E9E9E9
| 380105 ||  || — || December 21, 2000 || Kitt Peak || Spacewatch || — || align=right | 2.6 km || 
|-id=106 bgcolor=#fefefe
| 380106 ||  || — || February 29, 2008 || Kitt Peak || Spacewatch || — || align=right | 1.0 km || 
|-id=107 bgcolor=#E9E9E9
| 380107 ||  || — || May 2, 1997 || Caussols || ODAS || — || align=right | 2.6 km || 
|-id=108 bgcolor=#E9E9E9
| 380108 ||  || — || November 26, 2009 || Mount Lemmon || Mount Lemmon Survey || — || align=right | 1.1 km || 
|-id=109 bgcolor=#E9E9E9
| 380109 ||  || — || September 2, 2000 || Anderson Mesa || LONEOS || — || align=right | 1.4 km || 
|-id=110 bgcolor=#E9E9E9
| 380110 ||  || — || April 28, 2007 || Kitt Peak || Spacewatch || WIT || align=right | 1.1 km || 
|-id=111 bgcolor=#fefefe
| 380111 ||  || — || September 19, 2003 || Socorro || LINEAR || — || align=right data-sort-value="0.92" | 920 m || 
|-id=112 bgcolor=#d6d6d6
| 380112 ||  || — || October 10, 2008 || Mount Lemmon || Mount Lemmon Survey || KOR || align=right | 1.4 km || 
|-id=113 bgcolor=#fefefe
| 380113 ||  || — || March 26, 2006 || Kitt Peak || Spacewatch || — || align=right data-sort-value="0.75" | 750 m || 
|-id=114 bgcolor=#d6d6d6
| 380114 ||  || — || September 6, 2008 || Mount Lemmon || Mount Lemmon Survey || EOS || align=right | 2.1 km || 
|-id=115 bgcolor=#E9E9E9
| 380115 ||  || — || October 28, 1994 || Kitt Peak || Spacewatch || — || align=right | 2.6 km || 
|-id=116 bgcolor=#fefefe
| 380116 ||  || — || July 22, 1995 || Kitt Peak || Spacewatch || — || align=right data-sort-value="0.71" | 710 m || 
|-id=117 bgcolor=#E9E9E9
| 380117 ||  || — || September 25, 1995 || Kitt Peak || Spacewatch || — || align=right | 2.5 km || 
|-id=118 bgcolor=#E9E9E9
| 380118 ||  || — || October 17, 1995 || Kitt Peak || Spacewatch || — || align=right | 1.6 km || 
|-id=119 bgcolor=#E9E9E9
| 380119 ||  || — || November 15, 1995 || Kitt Peak || Spacewatch || — || align=right | 2.1 km || 
|-id=120 bgcolor=#E9E9E9
| 380120 ||  || — || December 16, 1995 || Kitt Peak || Spacewatch || JUN || align=right | 1.5 km || 
|-id=121 bgcolor=#fefefe
| 380121 ||  || — || January 15, 1996 || Kitt Peak || Spacewatch || — || align=right data-sort-value="0.62" | 620 m || 
|-id=122 bgcolor=#fefefe
| 380122 ||  || — || January 12, 1996 || Kitt Peak || Spacewatch || — || align=right data-sort-value="0.92" | 920 m || 
|-id=123 bgcolor=#fefefe
| 380123 ||  || — || September 5, 1996 || Kitt Peak || Spacewatch || — || align=right data-sort-value="0.68" | 680 m || 
|-id=124 bgcolor=#E9E9E9
| 380124 ||  || — || September 8, 1996 || Kitt Peak || Spacewatch || — || align=right data-sort-value="0.84" | 840 m || 
|-id=125 bgcolor=#FA8072
| 380125 ||  || — || October 18, 1996 || Haleakala || NEAT || — || align=right data-sort-value="0.70" | 700 m || 
|-id=126 bgcolor=#d6d6d6
| 380126 ||  || — || December 6, 1996 || Kitt Peak || Spacewatch || — || align=right | 2.8 km || 
|-id=127 bgcolor=#fefefe
| 380127 ||  || — || November 21, 1997 || Kitt Peak || Spacewatch || — || align=right data-sort-value="0.85" | 850 m || 
|-id=128 bgcolor=#FFC2E0
| 380128 ||  || — || November 26, 1997 || Haleakala || NEAT || APO || align=right data-sort-value="0.30" | 300 m || 
|-id=129 bgcolor=#E9E9E9
| 380129 ||  || — || April 23, 1998 || Socorro || LINEAR || BRU || align=right | 3.1 km || 
|-id=130 bgcolor=#fefefe
| 380130 ||  || — || September 14, 1998 || Socorro || LINEAR || ERI || align=right | 1.9 km || 
|-id=131 bgcolor=#d6d6d6
| 380131 ||  || — || September 26, 1998 || Socorro || LINEAR || — || align=right | 2.6 km || 
|-id=132 bgcolor=#fefefe
| 380132 ||  || — || October 14, 1998 || Socorro || LINEAR || — || align=right | 1.2 km || 
|-id=133 bgcolor=#FA8072
| 380133 ||  || — || October 27, 1998 || Kitt Peak || Spacewatch || — || align=right data-sort-value="0.30" | 300 m || 
|-id=134 bgcolor=#fefefe
| 380134 ||  || — || May 12, 1999 || Socorro || LINEAR || — || align=right | 1.4 km || 
|-id=135 bgcolor=#E9E9E9
| 380135 ||  || — || September 3, 1999 || Kitt Peak || Spacewatch || — || align=right | 3.3 km || 
|-id=136 bgcolor=#E9E9E9
| 380136 ||  || — || September 7, 1999 || Socorro || LINEAR || — || align=right | 3.2 km || 
|-id=137 bgcolor=#E9E9E9
| 380137 ||  || — || September 8, 1999 || Socorro || LINEAR || — || align=right | 3.4 km || 
|-id=138 bgcolor=#FA8072
| 380138 ||  || — || October 4, 1999 || Socorro || LINEAR || — || align=right data-sort-value="0.81" | 810 m || 
|-id=139 bgcolor=#E9E9E9
| 380139 ||  || — || October 11, 1999 || Kitt Peak || Spacewatch || — || align=right | 1.8 km || 
|-id=140 bgcolor=#E9E9E9
| 380140 ||  || — || October 4, 1999 || Socorro || LINEAR || — || align=right | 2.8 km || 
|-id=141 bgcolor=#E9E9E9
| 380141 ||  || — || October 4, 1999 || Catalina || CSS || — || align=right | 3.2 km || 
|-id=142 bgcolor=#E9E9E9
| 380142 ||  || — || October 12, 1999 || Kitt Peak || Spacewatch || — || align=right | 1.9 km || 
|-id=143 bgcolor=#E9E9E9
| 380143 ||  || — || October 19, 1999 || Bergisch Gladbach || W. Bickel || — || align=right | 3.5 km || 
|-id=144 bgcolor=#fefefe
| 380144 ||  || — || October 31, 1999 || Socorro || LINEAR || PHO || align=right | 1.5 km || 
|-id=145 bgcolor=#E9E9E9
| 380145 ||  || — || October 31, 1999 || Kitt Peak || Spacewatch || — || align=right | 1.8 km || 
|-id=146 bgcolor=#E9E9E9
| 380146 ||  || — || October 30, 1999 || Catalina || CSS || — || align=right | 2.6 km || 
|-id=147 bgcolor=#E9E9E9
| 380147 ||  || — || October 31, 1999 || Socorro || LINEAR || — || align=right | 2.7 km || 
|-id=148 bgcolor=#E9E9E9
| 380148 ||  || — || November 2, 1999 || Kitt Peak || Spacewatch || GEF || align=right | 1.7 km || 
|-id=149 bgcolor=#E9E9E9
| 380149 ||  || — || November 4, 1999 || Socorro || LINEAR || — || align=right | 2.5 km || 
|-id=150 bgcolor=#E9E9E9
| 380150 ||  || — || November 6, 1999 || Kitt Peak || Spacewatch || — || align=right | 2.9 km || 
|-id=151 bgcolor=#E9E9E9
| 380151 ||  || — || November 5, 1999 || Kitt Peak || Spacewatch || — || align=right | 2.4 km || 
|-id=152 bgcolor=#FA8072
| 380152 ||  || — || December 28, 1999 || Socorro || LINEAR || — || align=right | 1.5 km || 
|-id=153 bgcolor=#fefefe
| 380153 ||  || — || January 3, 2000 || Socorro || LINEAR || FLO || align=right data-sort-value="0.83" | 830 m || 
|-id=154 bgcolor=#fefefe
| 380154 ||  || — || January 5, 2000 || Socorro || LINEAR || PHO || align=right | 1.5 km || 
|-id=155 bgcolor=#fefefe
| 380155 ||  || — || January 7, 2000 || Socorro || LINEAR || PHO || align=right | 1.7 km || 
|-id=156 bgcolor=#fefefe
| 380156 ||  || — || January 28, 2000 || Kitt Peak || Spacewatch || ERI || align=right | 1.7 km || 
|-id=157 bgcolor=#fefefe
| 380157 ||  || — || January 29, 2000 || Kitt Peak || Spacewatch || — || align=right data-sort-value="0.94" | 940 m || 
|-id=158 bgcolor=#d6d6d6
| 380158 ||  || — || March 3, 2000 || Kitt Peak || Spacewatch || — || align=right | 1.7 km || 
|-id=159 bgcolor=#fefefe
| 380159 ||  || — || April 29, 2000 || Socorro || LINEAR || — || align=right | 1.5 km || 
|-id=160 bgcolor=#FFC2E0
| 380160 ||  || — || May 10, 2000 || Socorro || LINEAR || AMO +1km || align=right data-sort-value="0.97" | 970 m || 
|-id=161 bgcolor=#FA8072
| 380161 ||  || — || June 7, 2000 || Socorro || LINEAR || — || align=right | 1.8 km || 
|-id=162 bgcolor=#E9E9E9
| 380162 ||  || — || August 6, 2000 || Siding Spring || R. H. McNaught || — || align=right | 3.4 km || 
|-id=163 bgcolor=#FA8072
| 380163 ||  || — || August 26, 2000 || Socorro || LINEAR || — || align=right | 1.2 km || 
|-id=164 bgcolor=#E9E9E9
| 380164 ||  || — || August 24, 2000 || Socorro || LINEAR || — || align=right | 1.6 km || 
|-id=165 bgcolor=#E9E9E9
| 380165 ||  || — || August 24, 2000 || Socorro || LINEAR || — || align=right | 1.2 km || 
|-id=166 bgcolor=#E9E9E9
| 380166 ||  || — || August 25, 2000 || Socorro || LINEAR || — || align=right | 1.3 km || 
|-id=167 bgcolor=#E9E9E9
| 380167 ||  || — || August 31, 2000 || Socorro || LINEAR || EUN || align=right | 1.8 km || 
|-id=168 bgcolor=#E9E9E9
| 380168 ||  || — || August 31, 2000 || Socorro || LINEAR || — || align=right | 2.0 km || 
|-id=169 bgcolor=#E9E9E9
| 380169 ||  || — || August 26, 2000 || Socorro || LINEAR || — || align=right | 1.1 km || 
|-id=170 bgcolor=#E9E9E9
| 380170 ||  || — || August 31, 2000 || Socorro || LINEAR || — || align=right | 1.1 km || 
|-id=171 bgcolor=#E9E9E9
| 380171 ||  || — || September 1, 2000 || Socorro || LINEAR || JUN || align=right | 1.00 km || 
|-id=172 bgcolor=#E9E9E9
| 380172 ||  || — || September 4, 2000 || Haleakala || NEAT || — || align=right | 1.7 km || 
|-id=173 bgcolor=#E9E9E9
| 380173 ||  || — || September 5, 2000 || Anderson Mesa || LONEOS || GER || align=right | 1.5 km || 
|-id=174 bgcolor=#E9E9E9
| 380174 ||  || — || September 23, 2000 || Socorro || LINEAR || — || align=right | 1.7 km || 
|-id=175 bgcolor=#E9E9E9
| 380175 ||  || — || September 24, 2000 || Socorro || LINEAR || — || align=right | 1.5 km || 
|-id=176 bgcolor=#fefefe
| 380176 ||  || — || September 24, 2000 || Socorro || LINEAR || — || align=right data-sort-value="0.87" | 870 m || 
|-id=177 bgcolor=#E9E9E9
| 380177 ||  || — || September 23, 2000 || Socorro || LINEAR || — || align=right | 1.4 km || 
|-id=178 bgcolor=#E9E9E9
| 380178 ||  || — || September 23, 2000 || Socorro || LINEAR || EUN || align=right | 1.5 km || 
|-id=179 bgcolor=#E9E9E9
| 380179 ||  || — || September 24, 2000 || Socorro || LINEAR || — || align=right | 1.6 km || 
|-id=180 bgcolor=#E9E9E9
| 380180 ||  || — || September 23, 2000 || Socorro || LINEAR || — || align=right | 1.9 km || 
|-id=181 bgcolor=#E9E9E9
| 380181 ||  || — || September 24, 2000 || Socorro || LINEAR || — || align=right | 1.6 km || 
|-id=182 bgcolor=#E9E9E9
| 380182 ||  || — || September 27, 2000 || Socorro || LINEAR || — || align=right | 1.8 km || 
|-id=183 bgcolor=#E9E9E9
| 380183 ||  || — || September 23, 2000 || Socorro || LINEAR || JUN || align=right data-sort-value="0.88" | 880 m || 
|-id=184 bgcolor=#E9E9E9
| 380184 ||  || — || September 27, 2000 || Socorro || LINEAR || — || align=right | 1.2 km || 
|-id=185 bgcolor=#E9E9E9
| 380185 ||  || — || September 27, 2000 || Socorro || LINEAR || — || align=right | 3.5 km || 
|-id=186 bgcolor=#E9E9E9
| 380186 ||  || — || September 27, 2000 || Socorro || LINEAR || — || align=right | 1.9 km || 
|-id=187 bgcolor=#FA8072
| 380187 ||  || — || November 16, 2000 || Socorro || LINEAR || — || align=right | 2.1 km || 
|-id=188 bgcolor=#FFC2E0
| 380188 ||  || — || November 26, 2000 || Socorro || LINEAR || AMOcritical || align=right | 1.3 km || 
|-id=189 bgcolor=#E9E9E9
| 380189 ||  || — || November 19, 2000 || Socorro || LINEAR || — || align=right | 2.1 km || 
|-id=190 bgcolor=#E9E9E9
| 380190 ||  || — || November 20, 2000 || Socorro || LINEAR || — || align=right | 1.6 km || 
|-id=191 bgcolor=#E9E9E9
| 380191 ||  || — || November 21, 2000 || Socorro || LINEAR || — || align=right | 1.7 km || 
|-id=192 bgcolor=#E9E9E9
| 380192 ||  || — || November 19, 2000 || Socorro || LINEAR || EUN || align=right | 2.6 km || 
|-id=193 bgcolor=#E9E9E9
| 380193 ||  || — || November 25, 2000 || Socorro || LINEAR || — || align=right | 2.1 km || 
|-id=194 bgcolor=#E9E9E9
| 380194 ||  || — || November 25, 2000 || Socorro || LINEAR || IAN || align=right | 1.0 km || 
|-id=195 bgcolor=#E9E9E9
| 380195 ||  || — || December 1, 2000 || Socorro || LINEAR || JUN || align=right | 1.5 km || 
|-id=196 bgcolor=#E9E9E9
| 380196 ||  || — || December 4, 2000 || Socorro || LINEAR || — || align=right | 4.8 km || 
|-id=197 bgcolor=#E9E9E9
| 380197 ||  || — || December 26, 2000 || Kitt Peak || Spacewatch || — || align=right | 2.9 km || 
|-id=198 bgcolor=#FA8072
| 380198 ||  || — || December 27, 2000 || Anderson Mesa || LONEOS || — || align=right | 2.0 km || 
|-id=199 bgcolor=#FA8072
| 380199 ||  || — || December 28, 2000 || Socorro || LINEAR || unusual || align=right | 1.5 km || 
|-id=200 bgcolor=#E9E9E9
| 380200 ||  || — || December 30, 2000 || Socorro || LINEAR || JUN || align=right | 1.3 km || 
|}

380201–380300 

|-bgcolor=#E9E9E9
| 380201 ||  || — || December 30, 2000 || Socorro || LINEAR || — || align=right | 2.0 km || 
|-id=202 bgcolor=#E9E9E9
| 380202 ||  || — || January 2, 2001 || Socorro || LINEAR || — || align=right | 2.2 km || 
|-id=203 bgcolor=#E9E9E9
| 380203 ||  || — || January 19, 2001 || Socorro || LINEAR || — || align=right | 2.1 km || 
|-id=204 bgcolor=#E9E9E9
| 380204 ||  || — || February 1, 2001 || Socorro || LINEAR || — || align=right | 3.4 km || 
|-id=205 bgcolor=#FFC2E0
| 380205 ||  || — || February 5, 2001 || Socorro || LINEAR || AMO || align=right data-sort-value="0.49" | 490 m || 
|-id=206 bgcolor=#fefefe
| 380206 ||  || — || February 18, 2001 || Haleakala || NEAT || H || align=right data-sort-value="0.85" | 850 m || 
|-id=207 bgcolor=#E9E9E9
| 380207 ||  || — || March 15, 2001 || Kitt Peak || Spacewatch || — || align=right | 3.4 km || 
|-id=208 bgcolor=#E9E9E9
| 380208 ||  || — || March 20, 2001 || Haleakala || NEAT || — || align=right | 2.5 km || 
|-id=209 bgcolor=#E9E9E9
| 380209 ||  || — || March 18, 2001 || Socorro || LINEAR || — || align=right | 3.0 km || 
|-id=210 bgcolor=#fefefe
| 380210 ||  || — || April 18, 2001 || Socorro || LINEAR || — || align=right | 1.6 km || 
|-id=211 bgcolor=#E9E9E9
| 380211 ||  || — || April 17, 2001 || Anderson Mesa || LONEOS || — || align=right | 3.1 km || 
|-id=212 bgcolor=#d6d6d6
| 380212 ||  || — || July 19, 2001 || Palomar || NEAT || — || align=right | 3.2 km || 
|-id=213 bgcolor=#fefefe
| 380213 ||  || — || July 23, 2001 || Haleakala || NEAT || — || align=right | 1.5 km || 
|-id=214 bgcolor=#d6d6d6
| 380214 ||  || — || August 10, 2001 || Palomar || NEAT || — || align=right | 3.7 km || 
|-id=215 bgcolor=#d6d6d6
| 380215 ||  || — || August 16, 2001 || Socorro || LINEAR || TIR || align=right | 3.4 km || 
|-id=216 bgcolor=#fefefe
| 380216 ||  || — || August 22, 2001 || Kitt Peak || Spacewatch || MAS || align=right data-sort-value="0.88" | 880 m || 
|-id=217 bgcolor=#fefefe
| 380217 ||  || — || August 22, 2001 || Socorro || LINEAR || LCI || align=right | 1.3 km || 
|-id=218 bgcolor=#fefefe
| 380218 ||  || — || August 20, 2001 || Socorro || LINEAR || — || align=right | 2.7 km || 
|-id=219 bgcolor=#d6d6d6
| 380219 ||  || — || August 25, 2001 || Socorro || LINEAR || — || align=right | 3.6 km || 
|-id=220 bgcolor=#fefefe
| 380220 ||  || — || August 27, 2001 || Anderson Mesa || LONEOS || — || align=right data-sort-value="0.87" | 870 m || 
|-id=221 bgcolor=#d6d6d6
| 380221 ||  || — || September 8, 2001 || Socorro || LINEAR || — || align=right | 3.9 km || 
|-id=222 bgcolor=#d6d6d6
| 380222 ||  || — || September 12, 2001 || Socorro || LINEAR || EUP || align=right | 4.3 km || 
|-id=223 bgcolor=#FA8072
| 380223 ||  || — || September 10, 2001 || Socorro || LINEAR || — || align=right data-sort-value="0.72" | 720 m || 
|-id=224 bgcolor=#fefefe
| 380224 ||  || — || September 12, 2001 || Socorro || LINEAR || MAS || align=right data-sort-value="0.87" | 870 m || 
|-id=225 bgcolor=#fefefe
| 380225 ||  || — || September 12, 2001 || Socorro || LINEAR || — || align=right | 1.2 km || 
|-id=226 bgcolor=#fefefe
| 380226 ||  || — || September 7, 2001 || Palomar || NEAT || — || align=right | 1.3 km || 
|-id=227 bgcolor=#d6d6d6
| 380227 ||  || — || September 16, 2001 || Socorro || LINEAR || EUP || align=right | 3.8 km || 
|-id=228 bgcolor=#d6d6d6
| 380228 ||  || — || September 16, 2001 || Socorro || LINEAR || — || align=right | 3.7 km || 
|-id=229 bgcolor=#fefefe
| 380229 ||  || — || September 16, 2001 || Socorro || LINEAR || — || align=right | 1.2 km || 
|-id=230 bgcolor=#d6d6d6
| 380230 ||  || — || September 16, 2001 || Socorro || LINEAR || URS || align=right | 4.8 km || 
|-id=231 bgcolor=#fefefe
| 380231 ||  || — || September 16, 2001 || Socorro || LINEAR || — || align=right data-sort-value="0.92" | 920 m || 
|-id=232 bgcolor=#fefefe
| 380232 ||  || — || September 17, 2001 || Socorro || LINEAR || — || align=right | 1.1 km || 
|-id=233 bgcolor=#fefefe
| 380233 ||  || — || September 19, 2001 || Socorro || LINEAR || V || align=right data-sort-value="0.69" | 690 m || 
|-id=234 bgcolor=#fefefe
| 380234 ||  || — || September 19, 2001 || Socorro || LINEAR || — || align=right data-sort-value="0.93" | 930 m || 
|-id=235 bgcolor=#d6d6d6
| 380235 ||  || — || September 20, 2001 || Socorro || LINEAR || — || align=right | 3.9 km || 
|-id=236 bgcolor=#d6d6d6
| 380236 ||  || — || October 12, 2001 || Campo Imperatore || CINEOS || — || align=right | 4.2 km || 
|-id=237 bgcolor=#E9E9E9
| 380237 ||  || — || October 13, 2001 || Palomar || NEAT || — || align=right data-sort-value="0.99" | 990 m || 
|-id=238 bgcolor=#fefefe
| 380238 ||  || — || October 10, 2001 || Palomar || NEAT || NYS || align=right data-sort-value="0.76" | 760 m || 
|-id=239 bgcolor=#d6d6d6
| 380239 ||  || — || October 14, 2001 || Apache Point || SDSS || HYG || align=right | 2.6 km || 
|-id=240 bgcolor=#FA8072
| 380240 ||  || — || October 17, 2001 || Socorro || LINEAR || — || align=right data-sort-value="0.71" | 710 m || 
|-id=241 bgcolor=#d6d6d6
| 380241 ||  || — || October 23, 2001 || Desert Eagle || W. K. Y. Yeung || — || align=right | 3.8 km || 
|-id=242 bgcolor=#fefefe
| 380242 ||  || — || October 16, 2001 || Socorro || LINEAR || — || align=right | 2.0 km || 
|-id=243 bgcolor=#fefefe
| 380243 ||  || — || October 16, 2001 || Socorro || LINEAR || — || align=right | 1.4 km || 
|-id=244 bgcolor=#fefefe
| 380244 ||  || — || October 16, 2001 || Socorro || LINEAR || — || align=right | 1.2 km || 
|-id=245 bgcolor=#d6d6d6
| 380245 ||  || — || October 22, 2001 || Palomar || NEAT || — || align=right | 3.9 km || 
|-id=246 bgcolor=#fefefe
| 380246 ||  || — || October 24, 2001 || Palomar || NEAT || NYS || align=right data-sort-value="0.96" | 960 m || 
|-id=247 bgcolor=#d6d6d6
| 380247 ||  || — || October 23, 2001 || Palomar || NEAT || LIX || align=right | 4.6 km || 
|-id=248 bgcolor=#fefefe
| 380248 ||  || — || October 18, 2001 || Palomar || NEAT || — || align=right data-sort-value="0.78" | 780 m || 
|-id=249 bgcolor=#d6d6d6
| 380249 ||  || — || October 20, 2001 || Haleakala || NEAT || TIR || align=right | 3.6 km || 
|-id=250 bgcolor=#fefefe
| 380250 ||  || — || November 11, 2001 || Palomar || NEAT || — || align=right | 2.4 km || 
|-id=251 bgcolor=#fefefe
| 380251 ||  || — || November 19, 2001 || Socorro || LINEAR || — || align=right | 1.0 km || 
|-id=252 bgcolor=#d6d6d6
| 380252 ||  || — || October 21, 2001 || Socorro || LINEAR || HYG || align=right | 3.7 km || 
|-id=253 bgcolor=#fefefe
| 380253 ||  || — || November 20, 2001 || Socorro || LINEAR || — || align=right | 1.1 km || 
|-id=254 bgcolor=#fefefe
| 380254 ||  || — || November 18, 2001 || Socorro || LINEAR || — || align=right | 1.2 km || 
|-id=255 bgcolor=#E9E9E9
| 380255 ||  || — || December 10, 2001 || Socorro || LINEAR || — || align=right | 2.4 km || 
|-id=256 bgcolor=#E9E9E9
| 380256 ||  || — || December 9, 2001 || Socorro || LINEAR || — || align=right | 2.2 km || 
|-id=257 bgcolor=#E9E9E9
| 380257 ||  || — || December 13, 2001 || Socorro || LINEAR || — || align=right | 1.0 km || 
|-id=258 bgcolor=#E9E9E9
| 380258 ||  || — || December 14, 2001 || Socorro || LINEAR || — || align=right | 1.0 km || 
|-id=259 bgcolor=#E9E9E9
| 380259 ||  || — || December 14, 2001 || Socorro || LINEAR || — || align=right | 1.1 km || 
|-id=260 bgcolor=#E9E9E9
| 380260 ||  || — || December 15, 2001 || Socorro || LINEAR || — || align=right | 1.5 km || 
|-id=261 bgcolor=#d6d6d6
| 380261 ||  || — || November 20, 2001 || Socorro || LINEAR || — || align=right | 4.4 km || 
|-id=262 bgcolor=#E9E9E9
| 380262 ||  || — || December 13, 2001 || Palomar || NEAT || — || align=right data-sort-value="0.84" | 840 m || 
|-id=263 bgcolor=#E9E9E9
| 380263 ||  || — || December 17, 2001 || Socorro || LINEAR || EUN || align=right | 1.3 km || 
|-id=264 bgcolor=#E9E9E9
| 380264 ||  || — || December 18, 2001 || Socorro || LINEAR || — || align=right data-sort-value="0.94" | 940 m || 
|-id=265 bgcolor=#E9E9E9
| 380265 ||  || — || December 18, 2001 || Socorro || LINEAR || — || align=right | 1.0 km || 
|-id=266 bgcolor=#E9E9E9
| 380266 ||  || — || December 18, 2001 || Socorro || LINEAR || — || align=right | 1.6 km || 
|-id=267 bgcolor=#E9E9E9
| 380267 ||  || — || December 18, 2001 || Socorro || LINEAR || — || align=right | 2.4 km || 
|-id=268 bgcolor=#E9E9E9
| 380268 ||  || — || December 18, 2001 || Socorro || LINEAR || — || align=right | 1.3 km || 
|-id=269 bgcolor=#E9E9E9
| 380269 ||  || — || December 17, 2001 || Kitt Peak || Spacewatch || — || align=right | 1.1 km || 
|-id=270 bgcolor=#E9E9E9
| 380270 ||  || — || December 22, 2001 || Kitt Peak || Spacewatch || MAR || align=right | 1.1 km || 
|-id=271 bgcolor=#E9E9E9
| 380271 ||  || — || December 24, 2001 || Haleakala || NEAT || — || align=right | 1.2 km || 
|-id=272 bgcolor=#E9E9E9
| 380272 ||  || — || January 12, 2002 || Oizumi || T. Kobayashi || — || align=right | 1.5 km || 
|-id=273 bgcolor=#E9E9E9
| 380273 ||  || — || January 9, 2002 || Socorro || LINEAR || — || align=right | 1.5 km || 
|-id=274 bgcolor=#E9E9E9
| 380274 ||  || — || January 9, 2002 || Socorro || LINEAR || — || align=right | 1.3 km || 
|-id=275 bgcolor=#E9E9E9
| 380275 ||  || — || January 11, 2002 || Socorro || LINEAR || JUN || align=right | 2.6 km || 
|-id=276 bgcolor=#E9E9E9
| 380276 ||  || — || January 9, 2002 || Kitt Peak || Spacewatch || — || align=right | 1.6 km || 
|-id=277 bgcolor=#E9E9E9
| 380277 ||  || — || January 8, 2002 || Socorro || LINEAR || — || align=right | 3.1 km || 
|-id=278 bgcolor=#E9E9E9
| 380278 ||  || — || January 8, 2002 || Socorro || LINEAR || — || align=right | 1.9 km || 
|-id=279 bgcolor=#E9E9E9
| 380279 ||  || — || January 8, 2002 || Socorro || LINEAR || — || align=right | 2.4 km || 
|-id=280 bgcolor=#E9E9E9
| 380280 ||  || — || January 8, 2002 || Socorro || LINEAR || — || align=right | 3.1 km || 
|-id=281 bgcolor=#E9E9E9
| 380281 ||  || — || January 13, 2002 || Socorro || LINEAR || — || align=right | 1.1 km || 
|-id=282 bgcolor=#C7FF8F
| 380282 ||  || — || January 11, 2002 || Socorro || LINEAR || unusual || align=right | 11 km || 
|-id=283 bgcolor=#E9E9E9
| 380283 ||  || — || January 13, 2002 || Socorro || LINEAR || — || align=right | 1.0 km || 
|-id=284 bgcolor=#E9E9E9
| 380284 ||  || — || January 13, 2002 || Socorro || LINEAR || JUN || align=right | 1.5 km || 
|-id=285 bgcolor=#E9E9E9
| 380285 ||  || — || January 14, 2002 || Socorro || LINEAR || — || align=right | 2.5 km || 
|-id=286 bgcolor=#E9E9E9
| 380286 ||  || — || January 23, 2002 || Socorro || LINEAR || — || align=right | 1.5 km || 
|-id=287 bgcolor=#E9E9E9
| 380287 ||  || — || January 22, 2002 || Kitt Peak || Spacewatch || — || align=right data-sort-value="0.87" | 870 m || 
|-id=288 bgcolor=#E9E9E9
| 380288 ||  || — || January 19, 2002 || Socorro || LINEAR || RAF || align=right data-sort-value="0.98" | 980 m || 
|-id=289 bgcolor=#E9E9E9
| 380289 ||  || — || February 5, 2002 || Oaxaca || J. M. Roe || — || align=right | 2.4 km || 
|-id=290 bgcolor=#E9E9E9
| 380290 ||  || — || February 6, 2002 || Socorro || LINEAR || — || align=right | 1.6 km || 
|-id=291 bgcolor=#E9E9E9
| 380291 ||  || — || February 7, 2002 || Socorro || LINEAR || ADE || align=right | 2.8 km || 
|-id=292 bgcolor=#E9E9E9
| 380292 ||  || — || February 7, 2002 || Socorro || LINEAR || — || align=right | 1.5 km || 
|-id=293 bgcolor=#E9E9E9
| 380293 ||  || — || February 9, 2002 || Socorro || LINEAR || — || align=right | 1.3 km || 
|-id=294 bgcolor=#E9E9E9
| 380294 ||  || — || February 8, 2002 || Socorro || LINEAR || — || align=right | 1.0 km || 
|-id=295 bgcolor=#E9E9E9
| 380295 ||  || — || February 10, 2002 || Socorro || LINEAR || — || align=right data-sort-value="0.86" | 860 m || 
|-id=296 bgcolor=#E9E9E9
| 380296 ||  || — || February 10, 2002 || Socorro || LINEAR || — || align=right data-sort-value="0.98" | 980 m || 
|-id=297 bgcolor=#E9E9E9
| 380297 ||  || — || February 10, 2002 || Socorro || LINEAR || — || align=right data-sort-value="0.88" | 880 m || 
|-id=298 bgcolor=#E9E9E9
| 380298 ||  || — || February 10, 2002 || Socorro || LINEAR || — || align=right data-sort-value="0.90" | 900 m || 
|-id=299 bgcolor=#E9E9E9
| 380299 ||  || — || February 15, 2002 || Socorro || LINEAR || — || align=right | 1.6 km || 
|-id=300 bgcolor=#E9E9E9
| 380300 ||  || — || February 5, 2002 || Anderson Mesa || LONEOS || — || align=right | 1.0 km || 
|}

380301–380400 

|-bgcolor=#E9E9E9
| 380301 ||  || — || February 6, 2002 || Anderson Mesa || LONEOS || — || align=right | 3.8 km || 
|-id=302 bgcolor=#E9E9E9
| 380302 ||  || — || January 14, 2002 || Kitt Peak || Spacewatch || — || align=right | 1.8 km || 
|-id=303 bgcolor=#E9E9E9
| 380303 ||  || — || February 10, 2002 || Socorro || LINEAR || — || align=right | 1.1 km || 
|-id=304 bgcolor=#E9E9E9
| 380304 ||  || — || February 10, 2002 || Socorro || LINEAR || — || align=right | 2.1 km || 
|-id=305 bgcolor=#E9E9E9
| 380305 ||  || — || February 20, 2002 || Kitt Peak || Spacewatch || MAR || align=right data-sort-value="0.84" | 840 m || 
|-id=306 bgcolor=#E9E9E9
| 380306 ||  || — || March 9, 2002 || Kitt Peak || Spacewatch || — || align=right | 3.1 km || 
|-id=307 bgcolor=#C2FFFF
| 380307 ||  || — || March 5, 2002 || Kitt Peak || Spacewatch || L4 || align=right | 11 km || 
|-id=308 bgcolor=#E9E9E9
| 380308 ||  || — || March 14, 2002 || Socorro || LINEAR || — || align=right | 1.0 km || 
|-id=309 bgcolor=#E9E9E9
| 380309 ||  || — || March 9, 2002 || Anderson Mesa || LONEOS || — || align=right | 2.1 km || 
|-id=310 bgcolor=#E9E9E9
| 380310 ||  || — || March 9, 2002 || Anderson Mesa || LONEOS || ADE || align=right | 2.7 km || 
|-id=311 bgcolor=#E9E9E9
| 380311 ||  || — || March 11, 2002 || Palomar || NEAT || — || align=right | 1.9 km || 
|-id=312 bgcolor=#E9E9E9
| 380312 ||  || — || March 19, 2002 || Palomar || NEAT || JUN || align=right | 1.1 km || 
|-id=313 bgcolor=#E9E9E9
| 380313 ||  || — || April 11, 2002 || Palomar || NEAT || — || align=right | 3.7 km || 
|-id=314 bgcolor=#fefefe
| 380314 ||  || — || April 4, 2002 || Palomar || NEAT || — || align=right data-sort-value="0.92" | 920 m || 
|-id=315 bgcolor=#E9E9E9
| 380315 ||  || — || April 9, 2002 || Palomar || NEAT || ADE || align=right | 2.9 km || 
|-id=316 bgcolor=#fefefe
| 380316 ||  || — || April 9, 2002 || Kvistaberg || UDAS || — || align=right data-sort-value="0.99" | 990 m || 
|-id=317 bgcolor=#E9E9E9
| 380317 ||  || — || April 10, 2002 || Socorro || LINEAR || — || align=right | 1.9 km || 
|-id=318 bgcolor=#E9E9E9
| 380318 ||  || — || April 12, 2002 || Socorro || LINEAR || — || align=right | 1.7 km || 
|-id=319 bgcolor=#E9E9E9
| 380319 ||  || — || April 10, 2002 || Socorro || LINEAR || — || align=right | 1.5 km || 
|-id=320 bgcolor=#E9E9E9
| 380320 ||  || — || April 12, 2002 || Palomar || M. Meyer || AEO || align=right | 1.1 km || 
|-id=321 bgcolor=#FFC2E0
| 380321 ||  || — || April 19, 2002 || Kitt Peak || Spacewatch || AMO +1km || align=right data-sort-value="0.80" | 800 m || 
|-id=322 bgcolor=#E9E9E9
| 380322 ||  || — || April 22, 2002 || Socorro || LINEAR || — || align=right | 2.2 km || 
|-id=323 bgcolor=#E9E9E9
| 380323 ||  || — || May 6, 2002 || Kitt Peak || Spacewatch || — || align=right | 2.5 km || 
|-id=324 bgcolor=#E9E9E9
| 380324 ||  || — || May 6, 2002 || Kitt Peak || Spacewatch || — || align=right | 2.2 km || 
|-id=325 bgcolor=#fefefe
| 380325 ||  || — || May 8, 2002 || Socorro || LINEAR || — || align=right | 1.1 km || 
|-id=326 bgcolor=#E9E9E9
| 380326 ||  || — || May 7, 2002 || Socorro || LINEAR || ADE || align=right | 2.6 km || 
|-id=327 bgcolor=#E9E9E9
| 380327 ||  || — || June 5, 2002 || Kitt Peak || Spacewatch || — || align=right | 1.9 km || 
|-id=328 bgcolor=#d6d6d6
| 380328 ||  || — || July 9, 2002 || Palomar || NEAT || — || align=right | 2.7 km || 
|-id=329 bgcolor=#fefefe
| 380329 ||  || — || July 19, 2002 || Palomar || NEAT || FLO || align=right data-sort-value="0.59" | 590 m || 
|-id=330 bgcolor=#E9E9E9
| 380330 ||  || — || July 18, 2002 || Socorro || LINEAR || — || align=right | 6.0 km || 
|-id=331 bgcolor=#fefefe
| 380331 ||  || — || July 18, 2002 || Socorro || LINEAR || — || align=right | 1.3 km || 
|-id=332 bgcolor=#fefefe
| 380332 ||  || — || July 18, 2002 || Palomar || NEAT || — || align=right data-sort-value="0.66" | 660 m || 
|-id=333 bgcolor=#fefefe
| 380333 ||  || — || August 6, 2002 || Palomar || NEAT || — || align=right data-sort-value="0.64" | 640 m || 
|-id=334 bgcolor=#d6d6d6
| 380334 ||  || — || August 8, 2002 || Anderson Mesa || LONEOS || — || align=right | 2.8 km || 
|-id=335 bgcolor=#fefefe
| 380335 ||  || — || August 12, 2002 || Socorro || LINEAR || H || align=right data-sort-value="0.71" | 710 m || 
|-id=336 bgcolor=#FA8072
| 380336 ||  || — || August 15, 2002 || Socorro || LINEAR || H || align=right | 1.1 km || 
|-id=337 bgcolor=#fefefe
| 380337 ||  || — || August 11, 2002 || Palomar || NEAT || FLO || align=right data-sort-value="0.56" | 560 m || 
|-id=338 bgcolor=#fefefe
| 380338 ||  || — || August 15, 2002 || Palomar || NEAT || — || align=right data-sort-value="0.68" | 680 m || 
|-id=339 bgcolor=#d6d6d6
| 380339 ||  || — || June 26, 1997 || Kitt Peak || Spacewatch || — || align=right | 3.3 km || 
|-id=340 bgcolor=#fefefe
| 380340 ||  || — || August 17, 2002 || Palomar || NEAT || — || align=right | 1.0 km || 
|-id=341 bgcolor=#d6d6d6
| 380341 ||  || — || August 30, 2002 || Palomar || NEAT || JLI || align=right | 3.3 km || 
|-id=342 bgcolor=#fefefe
| 380342 ||  || — || August 18, 2002 || Palomar || NEAT || NYS || align=right data-sort-value="0.72" | 720 m || 
|-id=343 bgcolor=#fefefe
| 380343 ||  || — || August 28, 2002 || Palomar || NEAT || — || align=right data-sort-value="0.67" | 670 m || 
|-id=344 bgcolor=#d6d6d6
| 380344 ||  || — || August 26, 2002 || Palomar || NEAT || — || align=right | 2.5 km || 
|-id=345 bgcolor=#d6d6d6
| 380345 ||  || — || August 17, 2002 || Palomar || NEAT || — || align=right | 3.2 km || 
|-id=346 bgcolor=#d6d6d6
| 380346 ||  || — || August 16, 2002 || Palomar || NEAT || — || align=right | 2.5 km || 
|-id=347 bgcolor=#fefefe
| 380347 ||  || — || August 17, 2002 || Palomar || NEAT || — || align=right data-sort-value="0.55" | 550 m || 
|-id=348 bgcolor=#fefefe
| 380348 ||  || — || September 5, 2002 || Socorro || LINEAR || V || align=right data-sort-value="0.85" | 850 m || 
|-id=349 bgcolor=#d6d6d6
| 380349 ||  || — || September 12, 2002 || Palomar || NEAT || — || align=right | 3.6 km || 
|-id=350 bgcolor=#d6d6d6
| 380350 ||  || — || September 12, 2002 || Palomar || NEAT || — || align=right | 3.2 km || 
|-id=351 bgcolor=#fefefe
| 380351 ||  || — || September 14, 2002 || Palomar || NEAT || — || align=right data-sort-value="0.90" | 900 m || 
|-id=352 bgcolor=#d6d6d6
| 380352 ||  || — || September 14, 2002 || Palomar || NEAT || — || align=right | 3.1 km || 
|-id=353 bgcolor=#d6d6d6
| 380353 ||  || — || September 1, 2002 || Palomar || NEAT || KOR || align=right | 1.8 km || 
|-id=354 bgcolor=#fefefe
| 380354 ||  || — || September 4, 2002 || Palomar || NEAT || — || align=right data-sort-value="0.93" | 930 m || 
|-id=355 bgcolor=#fefefe
| 380355 ||  || — || September 4, 2002 || Palomar || NEAT || — || align=right data-sort-value="0.65" | 650 m || 
|-id=356 bgcolor=#fefefe
| 380356 ||  || — || September 27, 2002 || Palomar || NEAT || H || align=right data-sort-value="0.76" | 760 m || 
|-id=357 bgcolor=#fefefe
| 380357 ||  || — || October 2, 2002 || Socorro || LINEAR || — || align=right | 1.2 km || 
|-id=358 bgcolor=#fefefe
| 380358 ||  || — || October 2, 2002 || Socorro || LINEAR || NYS || align=right data-sort-value="0.71" | 710 m || 
|-id=359 bgcolor=#FFC2E0
| 380359 ||  || — || October 2, 2002 || Socorro || LINEAR || AMO +1km || align=right | 1.2 km || 
|-id=360 bgcolor=#d6d6d6
| 380360 ||  || — || October 3, 2002 || Campo Imperatore || CINEOS || — || align=right | 3.1 km || 
|-id=361 bgcolor=#d6d6d6
| 380361 ||  || — || October 2, 2002 || Campo Imperatore || CINEOS || EOS || align=right | 2.3 km || 
|-id=362 bgcolor=#fefefe
| 380362 ||  || — || October 4, 2002 || Kitt Peak || Spacewatch || FLO || align=right data-sort-value="0.97" | 970 m || 
|-id=363 bgcolor=#FA8072
| 380363 ||  || — || October 3, 2002 || Palomar || NEAT || — || align=right data-sort-value="0.83" | 830 m || 
|-id=364 bgcolor=#d6d6d6
| 380364 ||  || — || October 4, 2002 || Palomar || NEAT || — || align=right | 3.4 km || 
|-id=365 bgcolor=#E9E9E9
| 380365 ||  || — || October 4, 2002 || Palomar || NEAT || — || align=right | 3.6 km || 
|-id=366 bgcolor=#d6d6d6
| 380366 ||  || — || October 5, 2002 || Socorro || LINEAR || Tj (2.94) || align=right | 5.3 km || 
|-id=367 bgcolor=#fefefe
| 380367 ||  || — || October 4, 2002 || Socorro || LINEAR || FLO || align=right data-sort-value="0.66" | 660 m || 
|-id=368 bgcolor=#fefefe
| 380368 ||  || — || October 4, 2002 || Palomar || NEAT || FLO || align=right data-sort-value="0.81" | 810 m || 
|-id=369 bgcolor=#d6d6d6
| 380369 ||  || — || October 6, 2002 || Socorro || LINEAR || — || align=right | 3.1 km || 
|-id=370 bgcolor=#d6d6d6
| 380370 ||  || — || October 5, 2002 || Palomar || NEAT || — || align=right | 4.2 km || 
|-id=371 bgcolor=#d6d6d6
| 380371 ||  || — || October 7, 2002 || Socorro || LINEAR || — || align=right | 3.7 km || 
|-id=372 bgcolor=#fefefe
| 380372 ||  || — || October 7, 2002 || Socorro || LINEAR || V || align=right data-sort-value="0.87" | 870 m || 
|-id=373 bgcolor=#d6d6d6
| 380373 ||  || — || October 8, 2002 || Anderson Mesa || LONEOS || — || align=right | 3.7 km || 
|-id=374 bgcolor=#fefefe
| 380374 ||  || — || October 4, 2002 || Apache Point || SDSS || — || align=right | 1.0 km || 
|-id=375 bgcolor=#d6d6d6
| 380375 ||  || — || October 5, 2002 || Apache Point || SDSS || — || align=right | 2.6 km || 
|-id=376 bgcolor=#d6d6d6
| 380376 ||  || — || October 5, 2002 || Apache Point || SDSS || — || align=right | 2.2 km || 
|-id=377 bgcolor=#d6d6d6
| 380377 ||  || — || October 5, 2002 || Apache Point || SDSS || — || align=right | 2.8 km || 
|-id=378 bgcolor=#fefefe
| 380378 ||  || — || October 28, 2002 || Haleakala || NEAT || ERI || align=right | 1.8 km || 
|-id=379 bgcolor=#fefefe
| 380379 ||  || — || October 30, 2002 || Apache Point || SDSS || — || align=right data-sort-value="0.67" | 670 m || 
|-id=380 bgcolor=#fefefe
| 380380 ||  || — || October 31, 2002 || Palomar || NEAT || MAS || align=right data-sort-value="0.65" | 650 m || 
|-id=381 bgcolor=#fefefe
| 380381 ||  || — || November 1, 2002 || Palomar || NEAT || — || align=right data-sort-value="0.89" | 890 m || 
|-id=382 bgcolor=#d6d6d6
| 380382 ||  || — || October 5, 2002 || Socorro || LINEAR || — || align=right | 3.1 km || 
|-id=383 bgcolor=#fefefe
| 380383 ||  || — || November 5, 2002 || Socorro || LINEAR || — || align=right data-sort-value="0.87" | 870 m || 
|-id=384 bgcolor=#fefefe
| 380384 ||  || — || November 6, 2002 || Anderson Mesa || LONEOS || V || align=right data-sort-value="0.88" | 880 m || 
|-id=385 bgcolor=#d6d6d6
| 380385 ||  || — || November 7, 2002 || Anderson Mesa || LONEOS || — || align=right | 4.3 km || 
|-id=386 bgcolor=#d6d6d6
| 380386 ||  || — || November 7, 2002 || Socorro || LINEAR || MEL || align=right | 3.8 km || 
|-id=387 bgcolor=#fefefe
| 380387 ||  || — || November 13, 2002 || Palomar || NEAT || NYS || align=right data-sort-value="0.72" | 720 m || 
|-id=388 bgcolor=#d6d6d6
| 380388 ||  || — || November 13, 2002 || Palomar || NEAT || — || align=right | 2.9 km || 
|-id=389 bgcolor=#fefefe
| 380389 ||  || — || November 16, 2002 || Palomar || NEAT || V || align=right data-sort-value="0.59" | 590 m || 
|-id=390 bgcolor=#fefefe
| 380390 ||  || — || November 24, 2002 || Palomar || NEAT || MAS || align=right data-sort-value="0.65" | 650 m || 
|-id=391 bgcolor=#fefefe
| 380391 ||  || — || December 5, 2002 || Socorro || LINEAR || — || align=right data-sort-value="0.93" | 930 m || 
|-id=392 bgcolor=#fefefe
| 380392 ||  || — || December 5, 2002 || Socorro || LINEAR || — || align=right data-sort-value="0.87" | 870 m || 
|-id=393 bgcolor=#FA8072
| 380393 ||  || — || December 11, 2002 || Socorro || LINEAR || — || align=right data-sort-value="0.78" | 780 m || 
|-id=394 bgcolor=#fefefe
| 380394 ||  || — || December 11, 2002 || Socorro || LINEAR || PHO || align=right | 1.1 km || 
|-id=395 bgcolor=#d6d6d6
| 380395 ||  || — || December 11, 2002 || Socorro || LINEAR || — || align=right | 3.5 km || 
|-id=396 bgcolor=#d6d6d6
| 380396 ||  || — || December 14, 2002 || Socorro || LINEAR || EUP || align=right | 4.8 km || 
|-id=397 bgcolor=#fefefe
| 380397 ||  || — || December 15, 2002 || Ametlla de Mar || J. Nomen || PHO || align=right | 1.3 km || 
|-id=398 bgcolor=#fefefe
| 380398 ||  || — || December 5, 2002 || Socorro || LINEAR || NYS || align=right data-sort-value="0.70" | 700 m || 
|-id=399 bgcolor=#d6d6d6
| 380399 ||  || — || December 5, 2002 || Palomar || NEAT || — || align=right | 3.6 km || 
|-id=400 bgcolor=#d6d6d6
| 380400 ||  || — || December 3, 2002 || Palomar || NEAT || TIR || align=right | 2.8 km || 
|}

380401–380500 

|-bgcolor=#d6d6d6
| 380401 ||  || — || December 7, 2002 || Palomar || NEAT || MEL || align=right | 3.5 km || 
|-id=402 bgcolor=#fefefe
| 380402 ||  || — || December 3, 2002 || Haleakala || NEAT || NYS || align=right data-sort-value="0.70" | 700 m || 
|-id=403 bgcolor=#d6d6d6
| 380403 ||  || — || December 28, 2002 || Anderson Mesa || LONEOS || TIR || align=right | 5.0 km || 
|-id=404 bgcolor=#d6d6d6
| 380404 ||  || — || December 31, 2002 || Socorro || LINEAR || — || align=right | 4.2 km || 
|-id=405 bgcolor=#fefefe
| 380405 ||  || — || December 31, 2002 || Socorro || LINEAR || ERI || align=right | 1.8 km || 
|-id=406 bgcolor=#fefefe
| 380406 ||  || — || December 31, 2002 || Socorro || LINEAR || NYS || align=right data-sort-value="0.80" | 800 m || 
|-id=407 bgcolor=#d6d6d6
| 380407 ||  || — || January 3, 2003 || Kitt Peak || Spacewatch || — || align=right | 2.8 km || 
|-id=408 bgcolor=#d6d6d6
| 380408 ||  || — || January 7, 2003 || Socorro || LINEAR || — || align=right | 5.8 km || 
|-id=409 bgcolor=#fefefe
| 380409 ||  || — || January 5, 2003 || Socorro || LINEAR || PHO || align=right | 1.7 km || 
|-id=410 bgcolor=#FA8072
| 380410 ||  || — || January 5, 2003 || Socorro || LINEAR || — || align=right | 3.1 km || 
|-id=411 bgcolor=#fefefe
| 380411 ||  || — || January 5, 2003 || Socorro || LINEAR || — || align=right data-sort-value="0.98" | 980 m || 
|-id=412 bgcolor=#fefefe
| 380412 ||  || — || January 11, 2003 || Palomar || NEAT || PHO || align=right | 2.5 km || 
|-id=413 bgcolor=#d6d6d6
| 380413 ||  || — || January 10, 2003 || Socorro || LINEAR || — || align=right | 3.5 km || 
|-id=414 bgcolor=#d6d6d6
| 380414 ||  || — || January 5, 2003 || Socorro || LINEAR || TIR || align=right | 3.3 km || 
|-id=415 bgcolor=#d6d6d6
| 380415 ||  || — || January 7, 2003 || Socorro || LINEAR || THB || align=right | 6.3 km || 
|-id=416 bgcolor=#d6d6d6
| 380416 ||  || — || January 24, 2003 || La Silla || A. Boattini, H. Scholl || THB || align=right | 2.5 km || 
|-id=417 bgcolor=#fefefe
| 380417 ||  || — || January 24, 2003 || Palomar || NEAT || — || align=right | 1.7 km || 
|-id=418 bgcolor=#d6d6d6
| 380418 ||  || — || January 26, 2003 || Anderson Mesa || LONEOS || — || align=right | 3.4 km || 
|-id=419 bgcolor=#fefefe
| 380419 ||  || — || January 28, 2003 || Palomar || NEAT || — || align=right | 1.4 km || 
|-id=420 bgcolor=#d6d6d6
| 380420 ||  || — || January 27, 2003 || Haleakala || NEAT || — || align=right | 4.0 km || 
|-id=421 bgcolor=#d6d6d6
| 380421 ||  || — || December 4, 1996 || Kitt Peak || Spacewatch || — || align=right | 4.3 km || 
|-id=422 bgcolor=#d6d6d6
| 380422 ||  || — || March 7, 2003 || Palomar || NEAT || — || align=right | 1.8 km || 
|-id=423 bgcolor=#E9E9E9
| 380423 ||  || — || March 23, 2003 || Kitt Peak || Spacewatch || GER || align=right | 1.3 km || 
|-id=424 bgcolor=#fefefe
| 380424 ||  || — || March 27, 2003 || Palomar || NEAT || — || align=right | 1.2 km || 
|-id=425 bgcolor=#fefefe
| 380425 ||  || — || March 27, 2003 || Palomar || NEAT || — || align=right | 1.2 km || 
|-id=426 bgcolor=#E9E9E9
| 380426 ||  || — || April 24, 2003 || Kitt Peak || Spacewatch || — || align=right | 1.2 km || 
|-id=427 bgcolor=#E9E9E9
| 380427 ||  || — || April 27, 2003 || Anderson Mesa || LONEOS || — || align=right | 1.3 km || 
|-id=428 bgcolor=#E9E9E9
| 380428 ||  || — || May 1, 2003 || Socorro || LINEAR || — || align=right | 1.5 km || 
|-id=429 bgcolor=#E9E9E9
| 380429 ||  || — || August 1, 2003 || Socorro || LINEAR || TIN || align=right | 1.7 km || 
|-id=430 bgcolor=#E9E9E9
| 380430 ||  || — || August 23, 2003 || Socorro || LINEAR || — || align=right | 2.7 km || 
|-id=431 bgcolor=#FA8072
| 380431 ||  || — || August 23, 2003 || Socorro || LINEAR || — || align=right data-sort-value="0.68" | 680 m || 
|-id=432 bgcolor=#fefefe
| 380432 ||  || — || August 26, 2003 || Črni Vrh || Črni Vrh || — || align=right data-sort-value="0.75" | 750 m || 
|-id=433 bgcolor=#E9E9E9
| 380433 ||  || — || August 30, 2003 || Kitt Peak || Spacewatch || — || align=right | 2.5 km || 
|-id=434 bgcolor=#FA8072
| 380434 ||  || — || August 20, 2003 || Haleakala || NEAT || — || align=right data-sort-value="0.65" | 650 m || 
|-id=435 bgcolor=#E9E9E9
| 380435 ||  || — || September 17, 2003 || Socorro || LINEAR || — || align=right | 3.5 km || 
|-id=436 bgcolor=#fefefe
| 380436 ||  || — || September 17, 2003 || Palomar || NEAT || — || align=right data-sort-value="0.87" | 870 m || 
|-id=437 bgcolor=#fefefe
| 380437 ||  || — || September 19, 2003 || Anderson Mesa || LONEOS || FLO || align=right data-sort-value="0.60" | 600 m || 
|-id=438 bgcolor=#E9E9E9
| 380438 ||  || — || September 23, 2003 || Palomar || NEAT || — || align=right | 2.9 km || 
|-id=439 bgcolor=#E9E9E9
| 380439 ||  || — || September 28, 2003 || Kitt Peak || Spacewatch || — || align=right | 3.0 km || 
|-id=440 bgcolor=#fefefe
| 380440 ||  || — || September 26, 2003 || Socorro || LINEAR || — || align=right data-sort-value="0.71" | 710 m || 
|-id=441 bgcolor=#fefefe
| 380441 ||  || — || September 1, 2003 || Socorro || LINEAR || — || align=right data-sort-value="0.71" | 710 m || 
|-id=442 bgcolor=#fefefe
| 380442 ||  || — || September 28, 2003 || Kitt Peak || Spacewatch || — || align=right | 1.0 km || 
|-id=443 bgcolor=#E9E9E9
| 380443 ||  || — || September 29, 2003 || Kitt Peak || Spacewatch || WIT || align=right data-sort-value="0.89" | 890 m || 
|-id=444 bgcolor=#E9E9E9
| 380444 ||  || — || September 18, 2003 || Palomar || NEAT || GEF || align=right | 1.9 km || 
|-id=445 bgcolor=#E9E9E9
| 380445 ||  || — || September 20, 2003 || Socorro || LINEAR || — || align=right | 3.4 km || 
|-id=446 bgcolor=#E9E9E9
| 380446 ||  || — || September 30, 2003 || Kitt Peak || Spacewatch || HOF || align=right | 2.7 km || 
|-id=447 bgcolor=#E9E9E9
| 380447 ||  || — || September 17, 2003 || Anderson Mesa || LONEOS || — || align=right | 3.0 km || 
|-id=448 bgcolor=#E9E9E9
| 380448 ||  || — || September 26, 2003 || Apache Point || SDSS || AGN || align=right | 1.1 km || 
|-id=449 bgcolor=#d6d6d6
| 380449 ||  || — || September 28, 2003 || Socorro || LINEAR || — || align=right | 2.7 km || 
|-id=450 bgcolor=#d6d6d6
| 380450 ||  || — || September 26, 2003 || Apache Point || SDSS || — || align=right | 2.0 km || 
|-id=451 bgcolor=#E9E9E9
| 380451 ||  || — || September 19, 2003 || Kitt Peak || Spacewatch || — || align=right | 2.7 km || 
|-id=452 bgcolor=#E9E9E9
| 380452 ||  || — || September 26, 2003 || Apache Point || SDSS || — || align=right | 2.1 km || 
|-id=453 bgcolor=#fefefe
| 380453 ||  || — || October 15, 2003 || Anderson Mesa || LONEOS || — || align=right data-sort-value="0.82" | 820 m || 
|-id=454 bgcolor=#d6d6d6
| 380454 ||  || — || October 1, 2003 || Kitt Peak || Spacewatch || — || align=right | 2.1 km || 
|-id=455 bgcolor=#FFC2E0
| 380455 ||  || — || October 16, 2003 || Palomar || NEAT || APO +1km || align=right data-sort-value="0.98" | 980 m || 
|-id=456 bgcolor=#d6d6d6
| 380456 ||  || — || October 22, 2003 || Kingsnake || J. V. McClusky || — || align=right | 2.9 km || 
|-id=457 bgcolor=#fefefe
| 380457 ||  || — || October 16, 2003 || Palomar || NEAT || — || align=right | 1.0 km || 
|-id=458 bgcolor=#d6d6d6
| 380458 ||  || — || October 22, 2003 || Kitt Peak || Spacewatch || — || align=right | 2.9 km || 
|-id=459 bgcolor=#d6d6d6
| 380459 ||  || — || October 20, 2003 || Kitt Peak || Spacewatch || 628 || align=right | 1.8 km || 
|-id=460 bgcolor=#fefefe
| 380460 ||  || — || October 20, 2003 || Kitt Peak || Spacewatch || — || align=right data-sort-value="0.69" | 690 m || 
|-id=461 bgcolor=#fefefe
| 380461 ||  || — || October 21, 2003 || Anderson Mesa || LONEOS || — || align=right data-sort-value="0.67" | 670 m || 
|-id=462 bgcolor=#d6d6d6
| 380462 ||  || — || October 26, 2003 || Kitt Peak || Spacewatch || — || align=right | 3.4 km || 
|-id=463 bgcolor=#d6d6d6
| 380463 ||  || — || October 28, 2003 || Socorro || LINEAR || — || align=right | 2.3 km || 
|-id=464 bgcolor=#E9E9E9
| 380464 ||  || — || October 16, 2003 || Kitt Peak || Spacewatch || — || align=right | 2.4 km || 
|-id=465 bgcolor=#fefefe
| 380465 ||  || — || October 20, 2003 || Kitt Peak || Spacewatch || — || align=right data-sort-value="0.69" | 690 m || 
|-id=466 bgcolor=#d6d6d6
| 380466 ||  || — || October 20, 2003 || Socorro || LINEAR || 627 || align=right | 2.9 km || 
|-id=467 bgcolor=#E9E9E9
| 380467 ||  || — || October 16, 2003 || Kitt Peak || Spacewatch || — || align=right | 1.9 km || 
|-id=468 bgcolor=#E9E9E9
| 380468 ||  || — || October 17, 2003 || Apache Point || SDSS || — || align=right | 2.8 km || 
|-id=469 bgcolor=#E9E9E9
| 380469 ||  || — || October 19, 2003 || Apache Point || SDSS || — || align=right | 2.4 km || 
|-id=470 bgcolor=#d6d6d6
| 380470 ||  || — || September 28, 2003 || Kitt Peak || Spacewatch || KAR || align=right | 1.1 km || 
|-id=471 bgcolor=#fefefe
| 380471 ||  || — || October 23, 2003 || Apache Point || SDSS || FLO || align=right data-sort-value="0.51" | 510 m || 
|-id=472 bgcolor=#FA8072
| 380472 ||  || — || November 20, 2003 || Socorro || LINEAR || — || align=right | 1.3 km || 
|-id=473 bgcolor=#d6d6d6
| 380473 ||  || — || November 16, 2003 || Kitt Peak || Spacewatch || — || align=right | 2.2 km || 
|-id=474 bgcolor=#fefefe
| 380474 ||  || — || November 19, 2003 || Anderson Mesa || LONEOS || FLO || align=right data-sort-value="0.75" | 750 m || 
|-id=475 bgcolor=#d6d6d6
| 380475 ||  || — || November 21, 2003 || Socorro || LINEAR || SAN || align=right | 1.9 km || 
|-id=476 bgcolor=#FFC2E0
| 380476 ||  || — || December 18, 2003 || Kitt Peak || Spacewatch || APO || align=right data-sort-value="0.47" | 470 m || 
|-id=477 bgcolor=#fefefe
| 380477 ||  || — || December 19, 2003 || Socorro || LINEAR || — || align=right data-sort-value="0.73" | 730 m || 
|-id=478 bgcolor=#d6d6d6
| 380478 ||  || — || December 19, 2003 || Socorro || LINEAR || — || align=right | 3.1 km || 
|-id=479 bgcolor=#fefefe
| 380479 ||  || — || December 28, 2003 || Socorro || LINEAR || FLO || align=right data-sort-value="0.81" | 810 m || 
|-id=480 bgcolor=#d6d6d6
| 380480 Glennhawley ||  ||  || December 16, 2003 || Mauna Kea || D. D. Balam || EOS || align=right | 1.7 km || 
|-id=481 bgcolor=#d6d6d6
| 380481 ||  || — || December 22, 2003 || Kitt Peak || Spacewatch || — || align=right | 3.2 km || 
|-id=482 bgcolor=#d6d6d6
| 380482 ||  || — || January 15, 2004 || Kitt Peak || Spacewatch || — || align=right | 2.4 km || 
|-id=483 bgcolor=#fefefe
| 380483 ||  || — || January 15, 2004 || Kitt Peak || Spacewatch || FLO || align=right data-sort-value="0.58" | 580 m || 
|-id=484 bgcolor=#d6d6d6
| 380484 ||  || — || December 22, 2003 || Kitt Peak || Spacewatch || — || align=right | 2.9 km || 
|-id=485 bgcolor=#d6d6d6
| 380485 ||  || — || January 18, 2004 || Palomar || NEAT || — || align=right | 4.1 km || 
|-id=486 bgcolor=#d6d6d6
| 380486 ||  || — || January 21, 2004 || Socorro || LINEAR || EOS || align=right | 2.3 km || 
|-id=487 bgcolor=#fefefe
| 380487 ||  || — || January 21, 2004 || Socorro || LINEAR || H || align=right data-sort-value="0.87" | 870 m || 
|-id=488 bgcolor=#d6d6d6
| 380488 ||  || — || January 27, 2004 || Kitt Peak || Spacewatch || — || align=right | 4.2 km || 
|-id=489 bgcolor=#d6d6d6
| 380489 ||  || — || January 27, 2004 || Kitt Peak || Spacewatch || — || align=right | 2.7 km || 
|-id=490 bgcolor=#fefefe
| 380490 ||  || — || January 19, 2004 || Kitt Peak || Spacewatch || — || align=right data-sort-value="0.62" | 620 m || 
|-id=491 bgcolor=#d6d6d6
| 380491 ||  || — || February 11, 2004 || Kitt Peak || Spacewatch || EOS || align=right | 2.2 km || 
|-id=492 bgcolor=#d6d6d6
| 380492 ||  || — || February 11, 2004 || Anderson Mesa || LONEOS || EOS || align=right | 2.6 km || 
|-id=493 bgcolor=#fefefe
| 380493 ||  || — || February 12, 2004 || Kitt Peak || Spacewatch || — || align=right data-sort-value="0.60" | 600 m || 
|-id=494 bgcolor=#fefefe
| 380494 ||  || — || February 11, 2004 || Palomar || NEAT || H || align=right data-sort-value="0.67" | 670 m || 
|-id=495 bgcolor=#fefefe
| 380495 ||  || — || February 11, 2004 || Kitt Peak || Spacewatch || NYS || align=right data-sort-value="0.63" | 630 m || 
|-id=496 bgcolor=#d6d6d6
| 380496 ||  || — || February 13, 2004 || Kitt Peak || Spacewatch || — || align=right | 3.0 km || 
|-id=497 bgcolor=#d6d6d6
| 380497 ||  || — || February 11, 2004 || Kitt Peak || Spacewatch || — || align=right | 2.1 km || 
|-id=498 bgcolor=#d6d6d6
| 380498 ||  || — || February 16, 2004 || Kitt Peak || Spacewatch || — || align=right | 3.1 km || 
|-id=499 bgcolor=#fefefe
| 380499 ||  || — || February 18, 2004 || Catalina || CSS || — || align=right | 1.0 km || 
|-id=500 bgcolor=#fefefe
| 380500 ||  || — || February 17, 2004 || Kitt Peak || Spacewatch || — || align=right data-sort-value="0.92" | 920 m || 
|}

380501–380600 

|-bgcolor=#fefefe
| 380501 ||  || — || February 23, 2004 || Socorro || LINEAR || — || align=right data-sort-value="0.56" | 560 m || 
|-id=502 bgcolor=#d6d6d6
| 380502 ||  || — || January 4, 2004 || Siding Spring || R. H. McNaught || — || align=right | 3.2 km || 
|-id=503 bgcolor=#d6d6d6
| 380503 ||  || — || March 9, 2004 || Palomar || NEAT || — || align=right | 3.4 km || 
|-id=504 bgcolor=#fefefe
| 380504 ||  || — || February 26, 2004 || Socorro || LINEAR || ERI || align=right | 1.3 km || 
|-id=505 bgcolor=#d6d6d6
| 380505 ||  || — || March 15, 2004 || Kitt Peak || Spacewatch || — || align=right | 2.2 km || 
|-id=506 bgcolor=#d6d6d6
| 380506 ||  || — || March 14, 2004 || Socorro || LINEAR || — || align=right | 4.0 km || 
|-id=507 bgcolor=#d6d6d6
| 380507 ||  || — || March 15, 2004 || Socorro || LINEAR || — || align=right | 3.0 km || 
|-id=508 bgcolor=#fefefe
| 380508 ||  || — || March 15, 2004 || Socorro || LINEAR || — || align=right data-sort-value="0.89" | 890 m || 
|-id=509 bgcolor=#FA8072
| 380509 ||  || — || January 30, 2004 || Socorro || LINEAR || — || align=right data-sort-value="0.83" | 830 m || 
|-id=510 bgcolor=#fefefe
| 380510 ||  || — || January 18, 2004 || Kitt Peak || Spacewatch || — || align=right data-sort-value="0.92" | 920 m || 
|-id=511 bgcolor=#fefefe
| 380511 ||  || — || March 16, 2004 || Kitt Peak || Spacewatch || — || align=right data-sort-value="0.66" | 660 m || 
|-id=512 bgcolor=#fefefe
| 380512 ||  || — || March 16, 2004 || Socorro || LINEAR || PHO || align=right | 1.3 km || 
|-id=513 bgcolor=#fefefe
| 380513 ||  || — || March 18, 2004 || Kitt Peak || Spacewatch || V || align=right data-sort-value="0.86" | 860 m || 
|-id=514 bgcolor=#fefefe
| 380514 ||  || — || March 17, 2004 || Kitt Peak || Spacewatch || NYS || align=right data-sort-value="0.50" | 500 m || 
|-id=515 bgcolor=#fefefe
| 380515 ||  || — || March 22, 2004 || Socorro || LINEAR || NYS || align=right data-sort-value="0.82" | 820 m || 
|-id=516 bgcolor=#fefefe
| 380516 ||  || — || March 23, 2004 || Socorro || LINEAR || FLO || align=right | 1.1 km || 
|-id=517 bgcolor=#d6d6d6
| 380517 ||  || — || March 23, 2004 || Socorro || LINEAR || — || align=right | 4.8 km || 
|-id=518 bgcolor=#fefefe
| 380518 ||  || — || March 19, 2004 || Socorro || LINEAR || — || align=right | 1.0 km || 
|-id=519 bgcolor=#fefefe
| 380519 ||  || — || March 27, 2004 || Socorro || LINEAR || NYS || align=right data-sort-value="0.66" | 660 m || 
|-id=520 bgcolor=#d6d6d6
| 380520 ||  || — || March 27, 2004 || Socorro || LINEAR || — || align=right | 2.6 km || 
|-id=521 bgcolor=#d6d6d6
| 380521 ||  || — || March 18, 2004 || Palomar || NEAT || URS || align=right | 3.9 km || 
|-id=522 bgcolor=#fefefe
| 380522 || 2004 GK || — || April 10, 2004 || Wrightwood || J. W. Young || — || align=right | 1.1 km || 
|-id=523 bgcolor=#fefefe
| 380523 ||  || — || March 27, 2004 || Socorro || LINEAR || — || align=right data-sort-value="0.94" | 940 m || 
|-id=524 bgcolor=#FFC2E0
| 380524 ||  || — || April 11, 2004 || Catalina || CSS || AMO || align=right data-sort-value="0.33" | 330 m || 
|-id=525 bgcolor=#fefefe
| 380525 ||  || — || April 11, 2004 || Palomar || NEAT || — || align=right data-sort-value="0.95" | 950 m || 
|-id=526 bgcolor=#fefefe
| 380526 ||  || — || March 23, 2004 || Kitt Peak || Spacewatch || NYS || align=right data-sort-value="0.61" | 610 m || 
|-id=527 bgcolor=#d6d6d6
| 380527 ||  || — || April 12, 2004 || Socorro || LINEAR || — || align=right | 4.0 km || 
|-id=528 bgcolor=#fefefe
| 380528 ||  || — || April 11, 2004 || Palomar || NEAT || — || align=right | 1.3 km || 
|-id=529 bgcolor=#d6d6d6
| 380529 ||  || — || April 13, 2004 || Kitt Peak || Spacewatch || — || align=right | 3.0 km || 
|-id=530 bgcolor=#fefefe
| 380530 ||  || — || April 14, 2004 || Kitt Peak || Spacewatch || — || align=right data-sort-value="0.74" | 740 m || 
|-id=531 bgcolor=#fefefe
| 380531 ||  || — || April 12, 2004 || Palomar || NEAT || — || align=right | 1.3 km || 
|-id=532 bgcolor=#d6d6d6
| 380532 ||  || — || April 15, 2004 || Siding Spring || SSS || — || align=right | 4.4 km || 
|-id=533 bgcolor=#d6d6d6
| 380533 ||  || — || April 13, 2004 || Siding Spring || SSS || EUP || align=right | 4.8 km || 
|-id=534 bgcolor=#fefefe
| 380534 ||  || — || April 20, 2004 || Socorro || LINEAR || — || align=right data-sort-value="0.95" | 950 m || 
|-id=535 bgcolor=#fefefe
| 380535 ||  || — || March 31, 2004 || Kitt Peak || Spacewatch || — || align=right | 1.0 km || 
|-id=536 bgcolor=#fefefe
| 380536 ||  || — || April 22, 2004 || Campo Imperatore || CINEOS || MAS || align=right data-sort-value="0.75" | 750 m || 
|-id=537 bgcolor=#d6d6d6
| 380537 ||  || — || April 24, 2004 || Socorro || LINEAR || EUP || align=right | 4.2 km || 
|-id=538 bgcolor=#fefefe
| 380538 ||  || — || May 12, 2004 || Socorro || LINEAR || H || align=right data-sort-value="0.69" | 690 m || 
|-id=539 bgcolor=#fefefe
| 380539 ||  || — || May 12, 2004 || Apache Point || SDSS || H || align=right data-sort-value="0.71" | 710 m || 
|-id=540 bgcolor=#fefefe
| 380540 ||  || — || May 19, 2004 || Campo Imperatore || CINEOS || H || align=right data-sort-value="0.73" | 730 m || 
|-id=541 bgcolor=#fefefe
| 380541 ||  || — || May 23, 2004 || Socorro || LINEAR || H || align=right data-sort-value="0.65" | 650 m || 
|-id=542 bgcolor=#E9E9E9
| 380542 ||  || — || June 11, 2004 || Socorro || LINEAR || — || align=right | 1.1 km || 
|-id=543 bgcolor=#E9E9E9
| 380543 ||  || — || July 9, 2004 || Socorro || LINEAR || RAF || align=right | 1.4 km || 
|-id=544 bgcolor=#E9E9E9
| 380544 ||  || — || June 15, 2004 || Kitt Peak || Spacewatch || — || align=right data-sort-value="0.95" | 950 m || 
|-id=545 bgcolor=#E9E9E9
| 380545 ||  || — || July 11, 2004 || Socorro || LINEAR || — || align=right | 1.5 km || 
|-id=546 bgcolor=#FA8072
| 380546 ||  || — || June 18, 2004 || Socorro || LINEAR || — || align=right | 1.6 km || 
|-id=547 bgcolor=#E9E9E9
| 380547 ||  || — || July 9, 2004 || Anderson Mesa || LONEOS || — || align=right | 1.9 km || 
|-id=548 bgcolor=#E9E9E9
| 380548 ||  || — || July 14, 2004 || Siding Spring || SSS || JUN || align=right data-sort-value="0.95" | 950 m || 
|-id=549 bgcolor=#E9E9E9
| 380549 ||  || — || July 17, 2004 || Reedy Creek || J. Broughton || — || align=right | 1.1 km || 
|-id=550 bgcolor=#E9E9E9
| 380550 ||  || — || July 16, 2004 || Reedy Creek || J. Broughton || — || align=right | 3.6 km || 
|-id=551 bgcolor=#E9E9E9
| 380551 ||  || — || July 20, 2004 || Reedy Creek || J. Broughton || — || align=right | 1.2 km || 
|-id=552 bgcolor=#E9E9E9
| 380552 ||  || — || August 4, 2004 || Palomar || NEAT || — || align=right | 1.6 km || 
|-id=553 bgcolor=#E9E9E9
| 380553 ||  || — || August 7, 2004 || Palomar || NEAT || — || align=right | 1.1 km || 
|-id=554 bgcolor=#E9E9E9
| 380554 ||  || — || August 7, 2004 || Palomar || NEAT || — || align=right | 1.6 km || 
|-id=555 bgcolor=#E9E9E9
| 380555 ||  || — || August 7, 2004 || Campo Imperatore || CINEOS || — || align=right | 1.2 km || 
|-id=556 bgcolor=#E9E9E9
| 380556 ||  || — || August 8, 2004 || Socorro || LINEAR || — || align=right | 1.5 km || 
|-id=557 bgcolor=#E9E9E9
| 380557 ||  || — || August 8, 2004 || Socorro || LINEAR || — || align=right | 1.0 km || 
|-id=558 bgcolor=#E9E9E9
| 380558 ||  || — || August 10, 2004 || Socorro || LINEAR || — || align=right | 1.6 km || 
|-id=559 bgcolor=#E9E9E9
| 380559 ||  || — || August 15, 2004 || Campo Imperatore || CINEOS || — || align=right | 1.2 km || 
|-id=560 bgcolor=#E9E9E9
| 380560 ||  || — || August 12, 2004 || Cerro Tololo || M. W. Buie || — || align=right | 1.3 km || 
|-id=561 bgcolor=#E9E9E9
| 380561 ||  || — || August 21, 2004 || Wise || Wise Obs. || MIS || align=right | 2.4 km || 
|-id=562 bgcolor=#E9E9E9
| 380562 ||  || — || August 20, 2004 || Siding Spring || SSS || — || align=right | 1.6 km || 
|-id=563 bgcolor=#E9E9E9
| 380563 ||  || — || August 19, 2004 || Socorro || LINEAR || — || align=right | 2.3 km || 
|-id=564 bgcolor=#E9E9E9
| 380564 ||  || — || August 13, 2004 || Socorro || LINEAR || — || align=right | 2.1 km || 
|-id=565 bgcolor=#E9E9E9
| 380565 ||  || — || August 23, 2004 || Siding Spring || SSS || — || align=right | 1.5 km || 
|-id=566 bgcolor=#E9E9E9
| 380566 ||  || — || August 24, 2004 || Siding Spring || SSS || — || align=right | 1.8 km || 
|-id=567 bgcolor=#E9E9E9
| 380567 ||  || — || August 11, 2004 || Socorro || LINEAR || JUN || align=right | 1.1 km || 
|-id=568 bgcolor=#E9E9E9
| 380568 ||  || — || September 7, 2004 || Kitt Peak || Spacewatch || — || align=right | 1.4 km || 
|-id=569 bgcolor=#E9E9E9
| 380569 ||  || — || September 8, 2004 || Campo Imperatore || CINEOS || EUN || align=right | 2.0 km || 
|-id=570 bgcolor=#E9E9E9
| 380570 ||  || — || September 7, 2004 || Socorro || LINEAR || — || align=right | 2.1 km || 
|-id=571 bgcolor=#E9E9E9
| 380571 ||  || — || September 8, 2004 || Socorro || LINEAR || — || align=right data-sort-value="0.87" | 870 m || 
|-id=572 bgcolor=#E9E9E9
| 380572 ||  || — || September 8, 2004 || Socorro || LINEAR || JUN || align=right data-sort-value="0.84" | 840 m || 
|-id=573 bgcolor=#E9E9E9
| 380573 ||  || — || September 11, 2004 || Socorro || LINEAR || BAR || align=right | 1.6 km || 
|-id=574 bgcolor=#E9E9E9
| 380574 ||  || — || September 7, 2004 || Kitt Peak || Spacewatch || — || align=right | 1.2 km || 
|-id=575 bgcolor=#E9E9E9
| 380575 ||  || — || September 11, 2004 || Socorro || LINEAR || JUN || align=right | 1.8 km || 
|-id=576 bgcolor=#E9E9E9
| 380576 ||  || — || September 11, 2004 || Kitt Peak || Spacewatch || — || align=right | 1.6 km || 
|-id=577 bgcolor=#E9E9E9
| 380577 ||  || — || September 8, 2004 || Socorro || LINEAR || — || align=right | 1.3 km || 
|-id=578 bgcolor=#E9E9E9
| 380578 ||  || — || September 10, 2004 || Socorro || LINEAR || — || align=right | 1.5 km || 
|-id=579 bgcolor=#E9E9E9
| 380579 ||  || — || September 10, 2004 || Socorro || LINEAR || — || align=right | 2.2 km || 
|-id=580 bgcolor=#E9E9E9
| 380580 ||  || — || September 10, 2004 || Socorro || LINEAR || — || align=right | 2.0 km || 
|-id=581 bgcolor=#E9E9E9
| 380581 ||  || — || September 10, 2004 || Socorro || LINEAR || — || align=right | 1.9 km || 
|-id=582 bgcolor=#E9E9E9
| 380582 ||  || — || September 10, 2004 || Socorro || LINEAR || — || align=right | 2.0 km || 
|-id=583 bgcolor=#E9E9E9
| 380583 ||  || — || September 11, 2004 || Socorro || LINEAR || — || align=right | 1.7 km || 
|-id=584 bgcolor=#E9E9E9
| 380584 ||  || — || September 11, 2004 || Socorro || LINEAR || — || align=right | 2.0 km || 
|-id=585 bgcolor=#E9E9E9
| 380585 ||  || — || September 11, 2004 || Socorro || LINEAR || — || align=right | 1.7 km || 
|-id=586 bgcolor=#E9E9E9
| 380586 ||  || — || September 9, 2004 || Kitt Peak || Spacewatch || — || align=right | 1.5 km || 
|-id=587 bgcolor=#E9E9E9
| 380587 ||  || — || September 10, 2004 || Kitt Peak || Spacewatch || — || align=right data-sort-value="0.93" | 930 m || 
|-id=588 bgcolor=#E9E9E9
| 380588 ||  || — || September 14, 2004 || Socorro || LINEAR || — || align=right | 2.3 km || 
|-id=589 bgcolor=#E9E9E9
| 380589 ||  || — || September 15, 2004 || Socorro || LINEAR || HNS || align=right | 1.4 km || 
|-id=590 bgcolor=#E9E9E9
| 380590 ||  || — || September 14, 2004 || Andrushivka || G. Koval'chuk, V. Lokot' || — || align=right | 2.1 km || 
|-id=591 bgcolor=#E9E9E9
| 380591 ||  || — || September 15, 2004 || Anderson Mesa || LONEOS || — || align=right | 2.1 km || 
|-id=592 bgcolor=#E9E9E9
| 380592 ||  || — || September 13, 2004 || Socorro || LINEAR || EUN || align=right | 1.6 km || 
|-id=593 bgcolor=#E9E9E9
| 380593 ||  || — || September 13, 2004 || Socorro || LINEAR || — || align=right | 1.9 km || 
|-id=594 bgcolor=#E9E9E9
| 380594 ||  || — || September 7, 2004 || Socorro || LINEAR || EUN || align=right | 1.5 km || 
|-id=595 bgcolor=#E9E9E9
| 380595 ||  || — || September 10, 2004 || Kitt Peak || Spacewatch || — || align=right | 1.0 km || 
|-id=596 bgcolor=#E9E9E9
| 380596 ||  || — || September 17, 2004 || Socorro || LINEAR || — || align=right | 1.5 km || 
|-id=597 bgcolor=#E9E9E9
| 380597 ||  || — || September 17, 2004 || Anderson Mesa || LONEOS || MAR || align=right | 1.6 km || 
|-id=598 bgcolor=#E9E9E9
| 380598 ||  || — || September 17, 2004 || Socorro || LINEAR || EUN || align=right | 1.3 km || 
|-id=599 bgcolor=#E9E9E9
| 380599 ||  || — || September 17, 2004 || Socorro || LINEAR || — || align=right | 1.8 km || 
|-id=600 bgcolor=#E9E9E9
| 380600 ||  || — || September 17, 2004 || Socorro || LINEAR || — || align=right | 2.1 km || 
|}

380601–380700 

|-bgcolor=#E9E9E9
| 380601 ||  || — || September 13, 2004 || Anderson Mesa || LONEOS || — || align=right | 2.2 km || 
|-id=602 bgcolor=#E9E9E9
| 380602 ||  || — || September 8, 2004 || Socorro || LINEAR || — || align=right | 2.2 km || 
|-id=603 bgcolor=#E9E9E9
| 380603 ||  || — || October 4, 2004 || Kitt Peak || Spacewatch || — || align=right | 1.5 km || 
|-id=604 bgcolor=#E9E9E9
| 380604 ||  || — || October 5, 2004 || Kitt Peak || Spacewatch || — || align=right | 1.5 km || 
|-id=605 bgcolor=#E9E9E9
| 380605 ||  || — || October 5, 2004 || Kitt Peak || Spacewatch || ADE || align=right | 2.1 km || 
|-id=606 bgcolor=#E9E9E9
| 380606 ||  || — || October 5, 2004 || Anderson Mesa || LONEOS || — || align=right | 1.9 km || 
|-id=607 bgcolor=#E9E9E9
| 380607 Sharma ||  ||  || October 5, 2004 || Jarnac || Jarnac Obs. || — || align=right | 1.9 km || 
|-id=608 bgcolor=#E9E9E9
| 380608 ||  || — || October 5, 2004 || Palomar || NEAT || — || align=right | 1.9 km || 
|-id=609 bgcolor=#E9E9E9
| 380609 ||  || — || October 6, 2004 || Palomar || NEAT || — || align=right | 1.4 km || 
|-id=610 bgcolor=#E9E9E9
| 380610 ||  || — || October 5, 2004 || Kitt Peak || Spacewatch || — || align=right | 2.8 km || 
|-id=611 bgcolor=#E9E9E9
| 380611 ||  || — || October 6, 2004 || Kitt Peak || Spacewatch || — || align=right | 1.4 km || 
|-id=612 bgcolor=#E9E9E9
| 380612 ||  || — || October 7, 2004 || Anderson Mesa || LONEOS || — || align=right | 2.2 km || 
|-id=613 bgcolor=#E9E9E9
| 380613 ||  || — || October 7, 2004 || Socorro || LINEAR || MIS || align=right | 2.9 km || 
|-id=614 bgcolor=#E9E9E9
| 380614 ||  || — || October 9, 2004 || Anderson Mesa || LONEOS || — || align=right | 1.7 km || 
|-id=615 bgcolor=#E9E9E9
| 380615 ||  || — || October 6, 2004 || Kitt Peak || Spacewatch || — || align=right | 1.4 km || 
|-id=616 bgcolor=#E9E9E9
| 380616 ||  || — || October 7, 2004 || Kitt Peak || Spacewatch || — || align=right | 1.5 km || 
|-id=617 bgcolor=#E9E9E9
| 380617 ||  || — || October 6, 2004 || Palomar || NEAT || — || align=right | 3.3 km || 
|-id=618 bgcolor=#E9E9E9
| 380618 ||  || — || October 8, 2004 || Kitt Peak || Spacewatch || — || align=right | 2.0 km || 
|-id=619 bgcolor=#E9E9E9
| 380619 ||  || — || October 7, 2004 || Socorro || LINEAR || JUN || align=right | 1.3 km || 
|-id=620 bgcolor=#E9E9E9
| 380620 ||  || — || October 9, 2004 || Kitt Peak || Spacewatch || — || align=right | 1.9 km || 
|-id=621 bgcolor=#E9E9E9
| 380621 ||  || — || October 9, 2004 || Kitt Peak || Spacewatch || — || align=right | 1.9 km || 
|-id=622 bgcolor=#E9E9E9
| 380622 ||  || — || October 9, 2004 || Socorro || LINEAR || HNS || align=right | 1.7 km || 
|-id=623 bgcolor=#E9E9E9
| 380623 ||  || — || October 10, 2004 || Palomar || NEAT || — || align=right | 2.1 km || 
|-id=624 bgcolor=#E9E9E9
| 380624 ||  || — || September 17, 2004 || Kitt Peak || Spacewatch || MIS || align=right | 2.4 km || 
|-id=625 bgcolor=#E9E9E9
| 380625 ||  || — || October 9, 2004 || Socorro || LINEAR || ADE || align=right | 3.7 km || 
|-id=626 bgcolor=#E9E9E9
| 380626 ||  || — || October 11, 2004 || Palomar || NEAT || — || align=right | 2.1 km || 
|-id=627 bgcolor=#E9E9E9
| 380627 ||  || — || October 8, 2004 || Kitt Peak || Spacewatch || — || align=right | 1.9 km || 
|-id=628 bgcolor=#E9E9E9
| 380628 ||  || — || October 8, 2004 || Kitt Peak || Spacewatch || — || align=right | 1.6 km || 
|-id=629 bgcolor=#E9E9E9
| 380629 ||  || — || October 14, 2004 || Anderson Mesa || LONEOS || — || align=right | 2.7 km || 
|-id=630 bgcolor=#E9E9E9
| 380630 ||  || — || October 22, 2004 || Pla D'Arguines || Pla D'Arguines Obs. || INO || align=right | 1.4 km || 
|-id=631 bgcolor=#E9E9E9
| 380631 ||  || — || October 7, 2004 || Kitt Peak || Spacewatch || INO || align=right | 1.2 km || 
|-id=632 bgcolor=#E9E9E9
| 380632 ||  || — || November 4, 2004 || Kitt Peak || Spacewatch || — || align=right | 2.2 km || 
|-id=633 bgcolor=#E9E9E9
| 380633 ||  || — || November 4, 2004 || Kitt Peak || Spacewatch || — || align=right | 2.9 km || 
|-id=634 bgcolor=#E9E9E9
| 380634 ||  || — || November 3, 2004 || Anderson Mesa || LONEOS || — || align=right | 3.2 km || 
|-id=635 bgcolor=#E9E9E9
| 380635 ||  || — || December 2, 2004 || Catalina || CSS || — || align=right | 2.7 km || 
|-id=636 bgcolor=#FFC2E0
| 380636 ||  || — || December 10, 2004 || Catalina || CSS || ATEPHA || align=right data-sort-value="0.39" | 390 m || 
|-id=637 bgcolor=#E9E9E9
| 380637 ||  || — || December 8, 2004 || Socorro || LINEAR || EUN || align=right | 2.0 km || 
|-id=638 bgcolor=#E9E9E9
| 380638 ||  || — || December 8, 2004 || Socorro || LINEAR || IAN || align=right | 1.4 km || 
|-id=639 bgcolor=#E9E9E9
| 380639 ||  || — || December 2, 2004 || Palomar || NEAT || — || align=right | 2.5 km || 
|-id=640 bgcolor=#E9E9E9
| 380640 ||  || — || December 10, 2004 || Kitt Peak || Spacewatch || XIZ || align=right | 1.2 km || 
|-id=641 bgcolor=#E9E9E9
| 380641 ||  || — || December 11, 2004 || Socorro || LINEAR || JUN || align=right | 1.7 km || 
|-id=642 bgcolor=#E9E9E9
| 380642 ||  || — || December 14, 2004 || Socorro || LINEAR || — || align=right | 2.4 km || 
|-id=643 bgcolor=#E9E9E9
| 380643 ||  || — || December 11, 2004 || Catalina || CSS || ADE || align=right | 2.6 km || 
|-id=644 bgcolor=#E9E9E9
| 380644 ||  || — || December 11, 2004 || Catalina || CSS || — || align=right | 2.9 km || 
|-id=645 bgcolor=#E9E9E9
| 380645 ||  || — || December 13, 2004 || Kitt Peak || Spacewatch || — || align=right | 2.5 km || 
|-id=646 bgcolor=#E9E9E9
| 380646 ||  || — || December 13, 2004 || Kitt Peak || Spacewatch || — || align=right | 1.9 km || 
|-id=647 bgcolor=#E9E9E9
| 380647 ||  || — || December 15, 2004 || Socorro || LINEAR || — || align=right | 2.6 km || 
|-id=648 bgcolor=#E9E9E9
| 380648 ||  || — || December 12, 2004 || Kitt Peak || Spacewatch || — || align=right | 2.3 km || 
|-id=649 bgcolor=#E9E9E9
| 380649 ||  || — || December 17, 2004 || Haleakala || NEAT || — || align=right | 2.4 km || 
|-id=650 bgcolor=#E9E9E9
| 380650 ||  || — || December 16, 2004 || Socorro || LINEAR || — || align=right | 2.2 km || 
|-id=651 bgcolor=#E9E9E9
| 380651 ||  || — || December 16, 2004 || Socorro || LINEAR || — || align=right | 2.3 km || 
|-id=652 bgcolor=#E9E9E9
| 380652 ||  || — || January 6, 2005 || Socorro || LINEAR || — || align=right | 2.2 km || 
|-id=653 bgcolor=#E9E9E9
| 380653 ||  || — || January 13, 2005 || Catalina || CSS || INO || align=right | 1.7 km || 
|-id=654 bgcolor=#E9E9E9
| 380654 ||  || — || January 31, 2005 || Palomar || NEAT || — || align=right | 1.7 km || 
|-id=655 bgcolor=#E9E9E9
| 380655 ||  || — || February 1, 2005 || Catalina || CSS || — || align=right | 2.5 km || 
|-id=656 bgcolor=#E9E9E9
| 380656 ||  || — || February 3, 2005 || Socorro || LINEAR || — || align=right | 3.3 km || 
|-id=657 bgcolor=#d6d6d6
| 380657 ||  || — || February 17, 2005 || La Silla || A. Boattini, H. Scholl || THM || align=right | 2.7 km || 
|-id=658 bgcolor=#fefefe
| 380658 ||  || — || March 2, 2005 || Catalina || CSS || — || align=right data-sort-value="0.67" | 670 m || 
|-id=659 bgcolor=#d6d6d6
| 380659 ||  || — || March 3, 2005 || Kitt Peak || Spacewatch || — || align=right | 2.9 km || 
|-id=660 bgcolor=#d6d6d6
| 380660 ||  || — || March 4, 2005 || Kitt Peak || Spacewatch || — || align=right | 2.7 km || 
|-id=661 bgcolor=#fefefe
| 380661 ||  || — || March 9, 2005 || Mount Lemmon || Mount Lemmon Survey || — || align=right data-sort-value="0.72" | 720 m || 
|-id=662 bgcolor=#d6d6d6
| 380662 ||  || — || March 10, 2005 || Kitt Peak || Spacewatch || THM || align=right | 3.1 km || 
|-id=663 bgcolor=#d6d6d6
| 380663 ||  || — || March 10, 2005 || Mount Lemmon || Mount Lemmon Survey || EOS || align=right | 2.2 km || 
|-id=664 bgcolor=#d6d6d6
| 380664 ||  || — || March 9, 2005 || Catalina || CSS || — || align=right | 3.4 km || 
|-id=665 bgcolor=#FA8072
| 380665 ||  || — || March 10, 2005 || Anderson Mesa || LONEOS || — || align=right | 1.8 km || 
|-id=666 bgcolor=#d6d6d6
| 380666 ||  || — || March 12, 2005 || Socorro || LINEAR || — || align=right | 2.9 km || 
|-id=667 bgcolor=#d6d6d6
| 380667 ||  || — || March 11, 2005 || Mount Lemmon || Mount Lemmon Survey || — || align=right | 3.0 km || 
|-id=668 bgcolor=#d6d6d6
| 380668 ||  || — || March 9, 2005 || Mount Lemmon || Mount Lemmon Survey || — || align=right | 2.8 km || 
|-id=669 bgcolor=#d6d6d6
| 380669 ||  || — || March 10, 2005 || Catalina || CSS || EMA || align=right | 5.4 km || 
|-id=670 bgcolor=#d6d6d6
| 380670 ||  || — || March 10, 2005 || Mount Lemmon || Mount Lemmon Survey || EOS || align=right | 2.6 km || 
|-id=671 bgcolor=#d6d6d6
| 380671 ||  || — || April 2, 2005 || Mount Lemmon || Mount Lemmon Survey || — || align=right | 2.9 km || 
|-id=672 bgcolor=#fefefe
| 380672 ||  || — || April 1, 2005 || Kitt Peak || Spacewatch || — || align=right data-sort-value="0.68" | 680 m || 
|-id=673 bgcolor=#d6d6d6
| 380673 ||  || — || April 2, 2005 || Mount Lemmon || Mount Lemmon Survey || THM || align=right | 2.2 km || 
|-id=674 bgcolor=#d6d6d6
| 380674 ||  || — || April 4, 2005 || Mount Lemmon || Mount Lemmon Survey || — || align=right | 2.8 km || 
|-id=675 bgcolor=#fefefe
| 380675 ||  || — || April 5, 2005 || Palomar || NEAT || — || align=right data-sort-value="0.89" | 890 m || 
|-id=676 bgcolor=#d6d6d6
| 380676 ||  || — || April 2, 2005 || Mount Lemmon || Mount Lemmon Survey || — || align=right | 2.8 km || 
|-id=677 bgcolor=#d6d6d6
| 380677 ||  || — || April 2, 2005 || Mount Lemmon || Mount Lemmon Survey || VER || align=right | 3.1 km || 
|-id=678 bgcolor=#d6d6d6
| 380678 ||  || — || April 5, 2005 || Mount Lemmon || Mount Lemmon Survey || — || align=right | 4.6 km || 
|-id=679 bgcolor=#d6d6d6
| 380679 ||  || — || April 6, 2005 || Mount Lemmon || Mount Lemmon Survey || — || align=right | 4.7 km || 
|-id=680 bgcolor=#d6d6d6
| 380680 ||  || — || April 7, 2005 || Kitt Peak || Spacewatch || — || align=right | 3.6 km || 
|-id=681 bgcolor=#fefefe
| 380681 ||  || — || April 6, 2005 || Kitt Peak || Spacewatch || — || align=right data-sort-value="0.67" | 670 m || 
|-id=682 bgcolor=#d6d6d6
| 380682 ||  || — || April 7, 2005 || Palomar || NEAT || — || align=right | 3.5 km || 
|-id=683 bgcolor=#d6d6d6
| 380683 ||  || — || April 9, 2005 || Socorro || LINEAR || — || align=right | 2.7 km || 
|-id=684 bgcolor=#fefefe
| 380684 ||  || — || April 10, 2005 || Kitt Peak || Spacewatch || — || align=right data-sort-value="0.85" | 850 m || 
|-id=685 bgcolor=#fefefe
| 380685 ||  || — || April 10, 2005 || Mount Lemmon || Mount Lemmon Survey || — || align=right data-sort-value="0.81" | 810 m || 
|-id=686 bgcolor=#fefefe
| 380686 ||  || — || April 5, 2005 || Mount Lemmon || Mount Lemmon Survey || FLO || align=right data-sort-value="0.62" | 620 m || 
|-id=687 bgcolor=#d6d6d6
| 380687 ||  || — || May 4, 2005 || Kitt Peak || Spacewatch || — || align=right | 4.1 km || 
|-id=688 bgcolor=#d6d6d6
| 380688 ||  || — || May 4, 2005 || Mauna Kea || C. Veillet || — || align=right | 3.1 km || 
|-id=689 bgcolor=#fefefe
| 380689 ||  || — || May 4, 2005 || Palomar || NEAT || — || align=right | 1.1 km || 
|-id=690 bgcolor=#d6d6d6
| 380690 ||  || — || May 3, 2005 || Kitt Peak || Spacewatch || — || align=right | 2.5 km || 
|-id=691 bgcolor=#d6d6d6
| 380691 ||  || — || May 3, 2005 || Catalina || CSS || — || align=right | 4.3 km || 
|-id=692 bgcolor=#fefefe
| 380692 ||  || — || May 4, 2005 || Mount Lemmon || Mount Lemmon Survey || — || align=right data-sort-value="0.78" | 780 m || 
|-id=693 bgcolor=#d6d6d6
| 380693 ||  || — || May 4, 2005 || Kitt Peak || Spacewatch || EOS || align=right | 3.4 km || 
|-id=694 bgcolor=#fefefe
| 380694 ||  || — || May 8, 2005 || Kitt Peak || Spacewatch || — || align=right data-sort-value="0.90" | 900 m || 
|-id=695 bgcolor=#d6d6d6
| 380695 ||  || — || May 8, 2005 || Socorro || LINEAR || EUP || align=right | 4.6 km || 
|-id=696 bgcolor=#d6d6d6
| 380696 ||  || — || May 9, 2005 || Kitt Peak || Spacewatch || — || align=right | 3.6 km || 
|-id=697 bgcolor=#d6d6d6
| 380697 ||  || — || May 8, 2005 || Kitt Peak || Spacewatch || — || align=right | 2.9 km || 
|-id=698 bgcolor=#d6d6d6
| 380698 ||  || — || May 8, 2005 || Socorro || LINEAR || Tj (2.96) || align=right | 4.4 km || 
|-id=699 bgcolor=#d6d6d6
| 380699 ||  || — || May 10, 2005 || Kitt Peak || Spacewatch || — || align=right | 2.3 km || 
|-id=700 bgcolor=#d6d6d6
| 380700 ||  || — || May 9, 2005 || Socorro || LINEAR || URS || align=right | 4.7 km || 
|}

380701–380800 

|-bgcolor=#d6d6d6
| 380701 ||  || — || May 10, 2005 || Kitt Peak || Spacewatch || — || align=right | 3.8 km || 
|-id=702 bgcolor=#d6d6d6
| 380702 ||  || — || May 14, 2005 || Kitt Peak || Spacewatch || — || align=right | 2.3 km || 
|-id=703 bgcolor=#d6d6d6
| 380703 ||  || — || May 14, 2005 || Mount Lemmon || Mount Lemmon Survey || — || align=right | 4.3 km || 
|-id=704 bgcolor=#d6d6d6
| 380704 ||  || — || May 4, 2005 || Palomar || NEAT || EUP || align=right | 4.7 km || 
|-id=705 bgcolor=#d6d6d6
| 380705 ||  || — || May 17, 2005 || Mount Lemmon || Mount Lemmon Survey || CRO || align=right | 4.9 km || 
|-id=706 bgcolor=#fefefe
| 380706 ||  || — || May 17, 2005 || Socorro || LINEAR || — || align=right data-sort-value="0.98" | 980 m || 
|-id=707 bgcolor=#d6d6d6
| 380707 ||  || — || June 11, 2005 || Kitt Peak || Spacewatch || — || align=right | 5.8 km || 
|-id=708 bgcolor=#fefefe
| 380708 ||  || — || June 13, 2005 || Mount Lemmon || Mount Lemmon Survey || — || align=right data-sort-value="0.79" | 790 m || 
|-id=709 bgcolor=#d6d6d6
| 380709 ||  || — || June 29, 2005 || Palomar || NEAT || — || align=right | 3.4 km || 
|-id=710 bgcolor=#FA8072
| 380710 ||  || — || June 28, 2005 || Palomar || NEAT || — || align=right | 2.6 km || 
|-id=711 bgcolor=#fefefe
| 380711 ||  || — || June 14, 2005 || Mount Lemmon || Mount Lemmon Survey || — || align=right data-sort-value="0.74" | 740 m || 
|-id=712 bgcolor=#fefefe
| 380712 ||  || — || July 4, 2005 || Mount Lemmon || Mount Lemmon Survey || — || align=right data-sort-value="0.98" | 980 m || 
|-id=713 bgcolor=#fefefe
| 380713 ||  || — || July 3, 2005 || Mount Lemmon || Mount Lemmon Survey || — || align=right data-sort-value="0.65" | 650 m || 
|-id=714 bgcolor=#fefefe
| 380714 ||  || — || July 5, 2005 || Palomar || NEAT || V || align=right data-sort-value="0.81" | 810 m || 
|-id=715 bgcolor=#fefefe
| 380715 ||  || — || July 28, 2005 || Reedy Creek || J. Broughton || V || align=right data-sort-value="0.86" | 860 m || 
|-id=716 bgcolor=#fefefe
| 380716 ||  || — || July 28, 2005 || Palomar || NEAT || — || align=right data-sort-value="0.87" | 870 m || 
|-id=717 bgcolor=#fefefe
| 380717 ||  || — || August 27, 2005 || Junk Bond || D. Healy || NYS || align=right data-sort-value="0.63" | 630 m || 
|-id=718 bgcolor=#fefefe
| 380718 ||  || — || August 26, 2005 || Anderson Mesa || LONEOS || — || align=right | 1.9 km || 
|-id=719 bgcolor=#fefefe
| 380719 ||  || — || August 26, 2005 || Palomar || NEAT || V || align=right data-sort-value="0.79" | 790 m || 
|-id=720 bgcolor=#fefefe
| 380720 ||  || — || August 25, 2005 || Palomar || NEAT || critical || align=right data-sort-value="0.52" | 520 m || 
|-id=721 bgcolor=#fefefe
| 380721 ||  || — || August 28, 2005 || Kitt Peak || Spacewatch || NYS || align=right data-sort-value="0.90" | 900 m || 
|-id=722 bgcolor=#fefefe
| 380722 ||  || — || August 28, 2005 || Kitt Peak || Spacewatch || NYS || align=right data-sort-value="0.65" | 650 m || 
|-id=723 bgcolor=#fefefe
| 380723 ||  || — || August 28, 2005 || Kitt Peak || Spacewatch || — || align=right data-sort-value="0.89" | 890 m || 
|-id=724 bgcolor=#fefefe
| 380724 ||  || — || August 29, 2005 || Anderson Mesa || LONEOS || — || align=right | 1.1 km || 
|-id=725 bgcolor=#fefefe
| 380725 ||  || — || August 26, 2005 || Palomar || NEAT || NYS || align=right data-sort-value="0.71" | 710 m || 
|-id=726 bgcolor=#fefefe
| 380726 ||  || — || August 31, 2005 || Kitt Peak || Spacewatch || NYS || align=right | 1.7 km || 
|-id=727 bgcolor=#fefefe
| 380727 ||  || — || August 31, 2005 || Anderson Mesa || LONEOS || — || align=right data-sort-value="0.98" | 980 m || 
|-id=728 bgcolor=#E9E9E9
| 380728 ||  || — || September 1, 2005 || Palomar || NEAT || — || align=right data-sort-value="0.97" | 970 m || 
|-id=729 bgcolor=#FA8072
| 380729 ||  || — || September 11, 2005 || Anderson Mesa || LONEOS || — || align=right | 1.3 km || 
|-id=730 bgcolor=#fefefe
| 380730 ||  || — || September 13, 2005 || Kitt Peak || Spacewatch || H || align=right data-sort-value="0.81" | 810 m || 
|-id=731 bgcolor=#fefefe
| 380731 ||  || — || September 13, 2005 || Apache Point || A. C. Becker || — || align=right | 1.0 km || 
|-id=732 bgcolor=#fefefe
| 380732 ||  || — || September 24, 2005 || Kitt Peak || Spacewatch || — || align=right data-sort-value="0.90" | 900 m || 
|-id=733 bgcolor=#fefefe
| 380733 ||  || — || September 25, 2005 || Catalina || CSS || — || align=right | 1.2 km || 
|-id=734 bgcolor=#fefefe
| 380734 ||  || — || September 23, 2005 || Kitt Peak || Spacewatch || — || align=right data-sort-value="0.95" | 950 m || 
|-id=735 bgcolor=#fefefe
| 380735 ||  || — || September 23, 2005 || Kitt Peak || Spacewatch || NYS || align=right data-sort-value="0.82" | 820 m || 
|-id=736 bgcolor=#fefefe
| 380736 ||  || — || September 23, 2005 || Kitt Peak || Spacewatch || — || align=right data-sort-value="0.86" | 860 m || 
|-id=737 bgcolor=#fefefe
| 380737 ||  || — || September 24, 2005 || Kitt Peak || Spacewatch || NYS || align=right data-sort-value="0.68" | 680 m || 
|-id=738 bgcolor=#fefefe
| 380738 ||  || — || September 24, 2005 || Kitt Peak || Spacewatch || MAS || align=right data-sort-value="0.88" | 880 m || 
|-id=739 bgcolor=#fefefe
| 380739 ||  || — || September 23, 2005 || Catalina || CSS || — || align=right | 1.1 km || 
|-id=740 bgcolor=#fefefe
| 380740 ||  || — || September 24, 2005 || Kitt Peak || Spacewatch || MAS || align=right data-sort-value="0.93" | 930 m || 
|-id=741 bgcolor=#E9E9E9
| 380741 ||  || — || September 24, 2005 || Kitt Peak || Spacewatch || MAR || align=right | 1.1 km || 
|-id=742 bgcolor=#fefefe
| 380742 ||  || — || September 25, 2005 || Kitt Peak || Spacewatch || V || align=right data-sort-value="0.82" | 820 m || 
|-id=743 bgcolor=#fefefe
| 380743 ||  || — || September 25, 2005 || Kitt Peak || Spacewatch || — || align=right | 2.2 km || 
|-id=744 bgcolor=#fefefe
| 380744 ||  || — || September 26, 2005 || Kitt Peak || Spacewatch || MAS || align=right data-sort-value="0.73" | 730 m || 
|-id=745 bgcolor=#fefefe
| 380745 ||  || — || September 27, 2005 || Kitt Peak || Spacewatch || NYScritical || align=right data-sort-value="0.66" | 660 m || 
|-id=746 bgcolor=#fefefe
| 380746 ||  || — || September 27, 2005 || Kitt Peak || Spacewatch || MAS || align=right data-sort-value="0.70" | 700 m || 
|-id=747 bgcolor=#fefefe
| 380747 ||  || — || September 29, 2005 || Anderson Mesa || LONEOS || NYS || align=right data-sort-value="0.69" | 690 m || 
|-id=748 bgcolor=#fefefe
| 380748 ||  || — || September 25, 2005 || Kitt Peak || Spacewatch || MAS || align=right data-sort-value="0.86" | 860 m || 
|-id=749 bgcolor=#fefefe
| 380749 ||  || — || September 25, 2005 || Kitt Peak || Spacewatch || — || align=right | 1.3 km || 
|-id=750 bgcolor=#fefefe
| 380750 ||  || — || September 25, 2005 || Kitt Peak || Spacewatch || — || align=right data-sort-value="0.96" | 960 m || 
|-id=751 bgcolor=#fefefe
| 380751 ||  || — || September 25, 2005 || Kitt Peak || Spacewatch || MAScritical || align=right data-sort-value="0.65" | 650 m || 
|-id=752 bgcolor=#fefefe
| 380752 ||  || — || September 26, 2005 || Palomar || NEAT || — || align=right | 1.1 km || 
|-id=753 bgcolor=#fefefe
| 380753 ||  || — || September 27, 2005 || Kitt Peak || Spacewatch || NYS || align=right data-sort-value="0.72" | 720 m || 
|-id=754 bgcolor=#fefefe
| 380754 ||  || — || September 29, 2005 || Anderson Mesa || LONEOS || NYS || align=right data-sort-value="0.79" | 790 m || 
|-id=755 bgcolor=#fefefe
| 380755 ||  || — || September 30, 2005 || Kitt Peak || Spacewatch || MAS || align=right data-sort-value="0.79" | 790 m || 
|-id=756 bgcolor=#fefefe
| 380756 ||  || — || September 22, 2005 || Palomar || NEAT || MAS || align=right data-sort-value="0.79" | 790 m || 
|-id=757 bgcolor=#fefefe
| 380757 ||  || — || September 22, 2005 || Palomar || NEAT || — || align=right | 1.6 km || 
|-id=758 bgcolor=#fefefe
| 380758 ||  || — || September 30, 2005 || Palomar || NEAT || V || align=right data-sort-value="0.76" | 760 m || 
|-id=759 bgcolor=#fefefe
| 380759 ||  || — || October 1, 2005 || Catalina || CSS || V || align=right data-sort-value="0.91" | 910 m || 
|-id=760 bgcolor=#fefefe
| 380760 ||  || — || October 5, 2005 || Socorro || LINEAR || MAS || align=right data-sort-value="0.83" | 830 m || 
|-id=761 bgcolor=#fefefe
| 380761 ||  || — || October 6, 2005 || Kitt Peak || Spacewatch || ERI || align=right | 1.5 km || 
|-id=762 bgcolor=#fefefe
| 380762 ||  || — || October 3, 2005 || Catalina || CSS || CIM || align=right | 2.9 km || 
|-id=763 bgcolor=#fefefe
| 380763 ||  || — || October 5, 2005 || Kitt Peak || Spacewatch || NYS || align=right data-sort-value="0.67" | 670 m || 
|-id=764 bgcolor=#fefefe
| 380764 ||  || — || October 7, 2005 || Kitt Peak || Spacewatch || — || align=right data-sort-value="0.80" | 800 m || 
|-id=765 bgcolor=#fefefe
| 380765 ||  || — || October 7, 2005 || Kitt Peak || Spacewatch || — || align=right data-sort-value="0.79" | 790 m || 
|-id=766 bgcolor=#fefefe
| 380766 ||  || — || October 8, 2005 || Kitt Peak || Spacewatch || — || align=right data-sort-value="0.82" | 820 m || 
|-id=767 bgcolor=#fefefe
| 380767 ||  || — || October 6, 2005 || Mount Lemmon || Mount Lemmon Survey || MAS || align=right data-sort-value="0.90" | 900 m || 
|-id=768 bgcolor=#fefefe
| 380768 ||  || — || October 13, 2005 || Kitt Peak || Spacewatch || FLO || align=right data-sort-value="0.70" | 700 m || 
|-id=769 bgcolor=#fefefe
| 380769 ||  || — || October 22, 2005 || Catalina || CSS || V || align=right data-sort-value="0.97" | 970 m || 
|-id=770 bgcolor=#fefefe
| 380770 ||  || — || October 22, 2005 || Kitt Peak || Spacewatch || — || align=right | 1.0 km || 
|-id=771 bgcolor=#fefefe
| 380771 ||  || — || October 27, 2005 || Mount Lemmon || Mount Lemmon Survey || NYS || align=right data-sort-value="0.70" | 700 m || 
|-id=772 bgcolor=#fefefe
| 380772 ||  || — || October 25, 2005 || Kitt Peak || Spacewatch || — || align=right data-sort-value="0.79" | 790 m || 
|-id=773 bgcolor=#fefefe
| 380773 ||  || — || October 25, 2005 || Kitt Peak || Spacewatch || V || align=right data-sort-value="0.82" | 820 m || 
|-id=774 bgcolor=#fefefe
| 380774 ||  || — || October 25, 2005 || Kitt Peak || Spacewatch || V || align=right | 1.0 km || 
|-id=775 bgcolor=#fefefe
| 380775 ||  || — || October 25, 2005 || Kitt Peak || Spacewatch || MAS || align=right data-sort-value="0.72" | 720 m || 
|-id=776 bgcolor=#fefefe
| 380776 ||  || — || October 28, 2005 || Mount Lemmon || Mount Lemmon Survey || V || align=right data-sort-value="0.79" | 790 m || 
|-id=777 bgcolor=#fefefe
| 380777 ||  || — || October 27, 2005 || Catalina || CSS || — || align=right | 2.0 km || 
|-id=778 bgcolor=#E9E9E9
| 380778 ||  || — || October 29, 2005 || Catalina || CSS || — || align=right | 1.2 km || 
|-id=779 bgcolor=#d6d6d6
| 380779 ||  || — || October 28, 2005 || Kitt Peak || Spacewatch || SHU3:2 || align=right | 5.7 km || 
|-id=780 bgcolor=#E9E9E9
| 380780 ||  || — || October 25, 2005 || Mount Lemmon || Mount Lemmon Survey || — || align=right | 1.3 km || 
|-id=781 bgcolor=#d6d6d6
| 380781 ||  || — || October 28, 2005 || Kitt Peak || Spacewatch || SHU3:2 || align=right | 4.6 km || 
|-id=782 bgcolor=#d6d6d6
| 380782 ||  || — || October 23, 2005 || Kitt Peak || Spacewatch || 3:2 || align=right | 2.7 km || 
|-id=783 bgcolor=#fefefe
| 380783 ||  || — || October 26, 2005 || Apache Point || A. C. Becker || — || align=right | 1.0 km || 
|-id=784 bgcolor=#fefefe
| 380784 ||  || — || October 29, 2005 || Catalina || CSS || H || align=right data-sort-value="0.66" | 660 m || 
|-id=785 bgcolor=#FA8072
| 380785 ||  || — || November 6, 2005 || Eskridge || G. Hug || — || align=right data-sort-value="0.64" | 640 m || 
|-id=786 bgcolor=#d6d6d6
| 380786 ||  || — || November 6, 2005 || Kitt Peak || Spacewatch || 3:2 || align=right | 5.1 km || 
|-id=787 bgcolor=#fefefe
| 380787 ||  || — || November 4, 2005 || Mount Lemmon || Mount Lemmon Survey || H || align=right data-sort-value="0.46" | 460 m || 
|-id=788 bgcolor=#d6d6d6
| 380788 ||  || — || November 1, 2005 || Mount Lemmon || Mount Lemmon Survey || SHU3:2 || align=right | 6.1 km || 
|-id=789 bgcolor=#fefefe
| 380789 ||  || — || November 20, 2005 || Catalina || CSS || — || align=right | 1.5 km || 
|-id=790 bgcolor=#E9E9E9
| 380790 ||  || — || November 22, 2005 || Kitt Peak || Spacewatch || MAR || align=right | 1.2 km || 
|-id=791 bgcolor=#fefefe
| 380791 ||  || — || November 22, 2005 || Kitt Peak || Spacewatch || — || align=right | 1.3 km || 
|-id=792 bgcolor=#E9E9E9
| 380792 ||  || — || November 21, 2005 || Kitt Peak || Spacewatch || — || align=right | 1.3 km || 
|-id=793 bgcolor=#d6d6d6
| 380793 ||  || — || November 22, 2005 || Kitt Peak || Spacewatch || 3:2 || align=right | 4.0 km || 
|-id=794 bgcolor=#fefefe
| 380794 ||  || — || November 25, 2005 || Kitt Peak || Spacewatch || NYS || align=right data-sort-value="0.78" | 780 m || 
|-id=795 bgcolor=#E9E9E9
| 380795 ||  || — || November 21, 2005 || Kitt Peak || Spacewatch || — || align=right data-sort-value="0.73" | 730 m || 
|-id=796 bgcolor=#d6d6d6
| 380796 ||  || — || November 29, 2005 || Socorro || LINEAR || 3:2 || align=right | 4.8 km || 
|-id=797 bgcolor=#E9E9E9
| 380797 ||  || — || November 25, 2005 || Mount Lemmon || Mount Lemmon Survey || — || align=right data-sort-value="0.88" | 880 m || 
|-id=798 bgcolor=#E9E9E9
| 380798 ||  || — || November 29, 2005 || Kitt Peak || Spacewatch || — || align=right data-sort-value="0.93" | 930 m || 
|-id=799 bgcolor=#E9E9E9
| 380799 ||  || — || November 25, 2005 || Kitt Peak || Spacewatch || — || align=right data-sort-value="0.94" | 940 m || 
|-id=800 bgcolor=#fefefe
| 380800 ||  || — || November 29, 2005 || Palomar || NEAT || H || align=right data-sort-value="0.79" | 790 m || 
|}

380801–380900 

|-bgcolor=#E9E9E9
| 380801 ||  || — || November 29, 2005 || Kitt Peak || Spacewatch || — || align=right data-sort-value="0.90" | 900 m || 
|-id=802 bgcolor=#E9E9E9
| 380802 ||  || — || November 29, 2005 || Kitt Peak || Spacewatch || — || align=right data-sort-value="0.71" | 710 m || 
|-id=803 bgcolor=#E9E9E9
| 380803 ||  || — || November 30, 2005 || Kitt Peak || Spacewatch || — || align=right | 1.5 km || 
|-id=804 bgcolor=#E9E9E9
| 380804 ||  || — || December 2, 2005 || Kitt Peak || Spacewatch || — || align=right | 1.0 km || 
|-id=805 bgcolor=#E9E9E9
| 380805 ||  || — || December 7, 2005 || Kitt Peak || Spacewatch || — || align=right data-sort-value="0.98" | 980 m || 
|-id=806 bgcolor=#E9E9E9
| 380806 ||  || — || December 21, 2005 || Kitt Peak || Spacewatch || — || align=right data-sort-value="0.68" | 680 m || 
|-id=807 bgcolor=#E9E9E9
| 380807 ||  || — || December 4, 2005 || Mount Lemmon || Mount Lemmon Survey || — || align=right | 1.7 km || 
|-id=808 bgcolor=#E9E9E9
| 380808 ||  || — || December 24, 2005 || Kitt Peak || Spacewatch || — || align=right | 1.2 km || 
|-id=809 bgcolor=#E9E9E9
| 380809 ||  || — || December 21, 2005 || Catalina || CSS || — || align=right | 1.3 km || 
|-id=810 bgcolor=#fefefe
| 380810 ||  || — || December 25, 2005 || Anderson Mesa || LONEOS || H || align=right data-sort-value="0.94" | 940 m || 
|-id=811 bgcolor=#E9E9E9
| 380811 ||  || — || December 22, 2005 || Kitt Peak || Spacewatch || — || align=right | 1.2 km || 
|-id=812 bgcolor=#E9E9E9
| 380812 ||  || — || December 24, 2005 || Kitt Peak || Spacewatch || — || align=right | 1.0 km || 
|-id=813 bgcolor=#E9E9E9
| 380813 ||  || — || December 22, 2005 || Kitt Peak || Spacewatch || — || align=right | 1.0 km || 
|-id=814 bgcolor=#E9E9E9
| 380814 ||  || — || December 25, 2005 || Mount Lemmon || Mount Lemmon Survey || — || align=right | 1.3 km || 
|-id=815 bgcolor=#fefefe
| 380815 ||  || — || December 27, 2005 || Catalina || CSS || H || align=right data-sort-value="0.68" | 680 m || 
|-id=816 bgcolor=#E9E9E9
| 380816 ||  || — || December 28, 2005 || Kitt Peak || Spacewatch || — || align=right | 1.1 km || 
|-id=817 bgcolor=#E9E9E9
| 380817 ||  || — || December 26, 2005 || Kitt Peak || Spacewatch || — || align=right data-sort-value="0.76" | 760 m || 
|-id=818 bgcolor=#FFC2E0
| 380818 ||  || — || December 30, 2005 || Siding Spring || SSS || ATE || align=right data-sort-value="0.26" | 260 m || 
|-id=819 bgcolor=#E9E9E9
| 380819 ||  || — || December 26, 2005 || Kitt Peak || Spacewatch || — || align=right | 1.3 km || 
|-id=820 bgcolor=#E9E9E9
| 380820 ||  || — || December 26, 2005 || Kitt Peak || Spacewatch || — || align=right | 1.2 km || 
|-id=821 bgcolor=#E9E9E9
| 380821 ||  || — || December 28, 2005 || Mount Lemmon || Mount Lemmon Survey || — || align=right | 1.3 km || 
|-id=822 bgcolor=#E9E9E9
| 380822 ||  || — || December 28, 2005 || Kitt Peak || Spacewatch || — || align=right data-sort-value="0.88" | 880 m || 
|-id=823 bgcolor=#E9E9E9
| 380823 ||  || — || December 29, 2005 || Kitt Peak || Spacewatch || — || align=right | 1.5 km || 
|-id=824 bgcolor=#E9E9E9
| 380824 ||  || — || December 28, 2005 || Mount Lemmon || Mount Lemmon Survey || HEN || align=right data-sort-value="0.99" | 990 m || 
|-id=825 bgcolor=#E9E9E9
| 380825 ||  || — || December 26, 2005 || Catalina || CSS || — || align=right | 1.0 km || 
|-id=826 bgcolor=#E9E9E9
| 380826 ||  || — || December 30, 2005 || Catalina || CSS || — || align=right | 1.5 km || 
|-id=827 bgcolor=#E9E9E9
| 380827 ||  || — || December 25, 2005 || Catalina || CSS || JUN || align=right | 2.0 km || 
|-id=828 bgcolor=#E9E9E9
| 380828 ||  || — || December 25, 2005 || Mount Lemmon || Mount Lemmon Survey || ADE || align=right | 2.6 km || 
|-id=829 bgcolor=#E9E9E9
| 380829 ||  || — || December 29, 2005 || Kitt Peak || Spacewatch || — || align=right | 1.3 km || 
|-id=830 bgcolor=#E9E9E9
| 380830 ||  || — || December 30, 2005 || Catalina || CSS || — || align=right | 1.7 km || 
|-id=831 bgcolor=#E9E9E9
| 380831 ||  || — || December 29, 2005 || Kitt Peak || Spacewatch || — || align=right data-sort-value="0.98" | 980 m || 
|-id=832 bgcolor=#E9E9E9
| 380832 || 2006 AC || — || January 3, 2006 || Mayhill || A. Lowe || — || align=right | 1.3 km || 
|-id=833 bgcolor=#E9E9E9
| 380833 ||  || — || January 5, 2006 || Catalina || CSS || — || align=right | 1.0 km || 
|-id=834 bgcolor=#E9E9E9
| 380834 ||  || — || January 5, 2006 || Catalina || CSS || EUN || align=right | 2.0 km || 
|-id=835 bgcolor=#E9E9E9
| 380835 ||  || — || January 5, 2006 || Catalina || CSS || — || align=right | 1.7 km || 
|-id=836 bgcolor=#E9E9E9
| 380836 ||  || — || January 4, 2006 || Kitt Peak || Spacewatch || — || align=right | 2.7 km || 
|-id=837 bgcolor=#E9E9E9
| 380837 ||  || — || January 7, 2006 || Mount Lemmon || Mount Lemmon Survey || — || align=right data-sort-value="0.88" | 880 m || 
|-id=838 bgcolor=#E9E9E9
| 380838 ||  || — || January 6, 2006 || Mount Lemmon || Mount Lemmon Survey || EUN || align=right | 1.2 km || 
|-id=839 bgcolor=#E9E9E9
| 380839 ||  || — || January 8, 2006 || Anderson Mesa || LONEOS || — || align=right | 3.2 km || 
|-id=840 bgcolor=#E9E9E9
| 380840 ||  || — || January 9, 2006 || Kitt Peak || Spacewatch || MAR || align=right | 1.7 km || 
|-id=841 bgcolor=#E9E9E9
| 380841 ||  || — || January 5, 2006 || Mount Lemmon || Mount Lemmon Survey || — || align=right | 2.1 km || 
|-id=842 bgcolor=#E9E9E9
| 380842 ||  || — || January 6, 2006 || Kitt Peak || Spacewatch || EUN || align=right | 1.7 km || 
|-id=843 bgcolor=#E9E9E9
| 380843 ||  || — || November 29, 2005 || Mount Lemmon || Mount Lemmon Survey || — || align=right | 2.7 km || 
|-id=844 bgcolor=#E9E9E9
| 380844 ||  || — || January 6, 2006 || Kitt Peak || Spacewatch || — || align=right data-sort-value="0.78" | 780 m || 
|-id=845 bgcolor=#E9E9E9
| 380845 ||  || — || January 21, 2006 || Mount Lemmon || Mount Lemmon Survey || — || align=right | 1.1 km || 
|-id=846 bgcolor=#FA8072
| 380846 ||  || — || January 22, 2006 || Socorro || LINEAR || — || align=right | 1.4 km || 
|-id=847 bgcolor=#E9E9E9
| 380847 ||  || — || January 22, 2006 || Mount Lemmon || Mount Lemmon Survey || — || align=right | 2.7 km || 
|-id=848 bgcolor=#E9E9E9
| 380848 ||  || — || January 23, 2006 || Mount Lemmon || Mount Lemmon Survey || — || align=right | 2.0 km || 
|-id=849 bgcolor=#E9E9E9
| 380849 ||  || — || January 19, 2006 || Catalina || CSS || — || align=right | 2.5 km || 
|-id=850 bgcolor=#E9E9E9
| 380850 ||  || — || January 23, 2006 || 7300 Observatory || W. K. Y. Yeung || GER || align=right | 2.9 km || 
|-id=851 bgcolor=#E9E9E9
| 380851 ||  || — || January 23, 2006 || Kitt Peak || Spacewatch || — || align=right | 1.9 km || 
|-id=852 bgcolor=#E9E9E9
| 380852 ||  || — || January 23, 2006 || Kitt Peak || Spacewatch || — || align=right | 3.1 km || 
|-id=853 bgcolor=#E9E9E9
| 380853 ||  || — || January 23, 2006 || Socorro || LINEAR || — || align=right data-sort-value="0.91" | 910 m || 
|-id=854 bgcolor=#E9E9E9
| 380854 ||  || — || January 25, 2006 || Kitt Peak || Spacewatch || — || align=right | 1.2 km || 
|-id=855 bgcolor=#E9E9E9
| 380855 ||  || — || January 26, 2006 || Kitt Peak || Spacewatch || — || align=right | 1.3 km || 
|-id=856 bgcolor=#E9E9E9
| 380856 ||  || — || January 26, 2006 || Kitt Peak || Spacewatch || — || align=right | 1.9 km || 
|-id=857 bgcolor=#E9E9E9
| 380857 ||  || — || January 26, 2006 || Kitt Peak || Spacewatch || — || align=right | 1.5 km || 
|-id=858 bgcolor=#E9E9E9
| 380858 ||  || — || January 26, 2006 || Kitt Peak || Spacewatch || — || align=right | 1.2 km || 
|-id=859 bgcolor=#E9E9E9
| 380859 ||  || — || January 28, 2006 || Mount Lemmon || Mount Lemmon Survey || — || align=right | 1.8 km || 
|-id=860 bgcolor=#E9E9E9
| 380860 ||  || — || January 22, 2006 || Mount Lemmon || Mount Lemmon Survey || — || align=right | 1.6 km || 
|-id=861 bgcolor=#E9E9E9
| 380861 ||  || — || January 25, 2006 || Kitt Peak || Spacewatch || RAF || align=right data-sort-value="0.74" | 740 m || 
|-id=862 bgcolor=#E9E9E9
| 380862 ||  || — || January 25, 2006 || Kitt Peak || Spacewatch || — || align=right | 1.5 km || 
|-id=863 bgcolor=#E9E9E9
| 380863 ||  || — || January 25, 2006 || Kitt Peak || Spacewatch || — || align=right | 1.8 km || 
|-id=864 bgcolor=#E9E9E9
| 380864 ||  || — || January 27, 2006 || Mount Lemmon || Mount Lemmon Survey || HEN || align=right data-sort-value="0.99" | 990 m || 
|-id=865 bgcolor=#E9E9E9
| 380865 ||  || — || January 27, 2006 || Anderson Mesa || LONEOS || — || align=right | 2.0 km || 
|-id=866 bgcolor=#E9E9E9
| 380866 ||  || — || January 28, 2006 || Catalina || CSS || — || align=right | 2.6 km || 
|-id=867 bgcolor=#E9E9E9
| 380867 ||  || — || January 30, 2006 || Kitt Peak || Spacewatch || — || align=right | 1.6 km || 
|-id=868 bgcolor=#E9E9E9
| 380868 ||  || — || January 31, 2006 || Kitt Peak || Spacewatch || — || align=right | 1.2 km || 
|-id=869 bgcolor=#E9E9E9
| 380869 ||  || — || January 31, 2006 || Kitt Peak || Spacewatch || — || align=right | 1.3 km || 
|-id=870 bgcolor=#E9E9E9
| 380870 ||  || — || January 25, 2006 || Kitt Peak || Spacewatch || — || align=right | 2.2 km || 
|-id=871 bgcolor=#E9E9E9
| 380871 ||  || — || January 26, 2006 || Mount Lemmon || Mount Lemmon Survey || WIT || align=right | 1.2 km || 
|-id=872 bgcolor=#E9E9E9
| 380872 ||  || — || February 1, 2006 || Kitt Peak || Spacewatch || — || align=right | 2.4 km || 
|-id=873 bgcolor=#E9E9E9
| 380873 ||  || — || February 1, 2006 || Mount Lemmon || Mount Lemmon Survey || — || align=right | 2.6 km || 
|-id=874 bgcolor=#E9E9E9
| 380874 ||  || — || February 3, 2006 || Kitt Peak || Spacewatch || — || align=right | 1.4 km || 
|-id=875 bgcolor=#E9E9E9
| 380875 ||  || — || February 6, 2006 || Mount Lemmon || Mount Lemmon Survey || — || align=right | 1.6 km || 
|-id=876 bgcolor=#E9E9E9
| 380876 ||  || — || February 4, 2006 || Catalina || CSS || ADE || align=right | 3.5 km || 
|-id=877 bgcolor=#E9E9E9
| 380877 ||  || — || February 20, 2006 || Mayhill || A. Lowe || — || align=right | 3.3 km || 
|-id=878 bgcolor=#E9E9E9
| 380878 ||  || — || January 23, 2006 || Kitt Peak || Spacewatch || JUN || align=right | 1.1 km || 
|-id=879 bgcolor=#E9E9E9
| 380879 ||  || — || February 20, 2006 || Kitt Peak || Spacewatch || — || align=right | 1.1 km || 
|-id=880 bgcolor=#d6d6d6
| 380880 ||  || — || January 23, 2006 || Kitt Peak || Spacewatch || TIR || align=right | 3.2 km || 
|-id=881 bgcolor=#E9E9E9
| 380881 ||  || — || February 1, 2006 || Kitt Peak || Spacewatch || — || align=right | 3.0 km || 
|-id=882 bgcolor=#E9E9E9
| 380882 ||  || — || February 20, 2006 || Kitt Peak || Spacewatch || — || align=right | 1.8 km || 
|-id=883 bgcolor=#E9E9E9
| 380883 ||  || — || February 20, 2006 || Kitt Peak || Spacewatch || — || align=right | 2.2 km || 
|-id=884 bgcolor=#E9E9E9
| 380884 ||  || — || February 21, 2006 || Mount Lemmon || Mount Lemmon Survey || — || align=right | 1.3 km || 
|-id=885 bgcolor=#E9E9E9
| 380885 ||  || — || February 22, 2006 || Palomar || NEAT || — || align=right | 1.6 km || 
|-id=886 bgcolor=#E9E9E9
| 380886 ||  || — || February 23, 2006 || Anderson Mesa || LONEOS || — || align=right | 2.6 km || 
|-id=887 bgcolor=#E9E9E9
| 380887 ||  || — || February 24, 2006 || Socorro || LINEAR || BAR || align=right | 1.5 km || 
|-id=888 bgcolor=#E9E9E9
| 380888 ||  || — || February 20, 2006 || Kitt Peak || Spacewatch || — || align=right | 1.5 km || 
|-id=889 bgcolor=#E9E9E9
| 380889 ||  || — || February 21, 2006 || Mount Lemmon || Mount Lemmon Survey || — || align=right | 2.8 km || 
|-id=890 bgcolor=#E9E9E9
| 380890 ||  || — || February 22, 2006 || Anderson Mesa || LONEOS || — || align=right | 3.3 km || 
|-id=891 bgcolor=#E9E9E9
| 380891 ||  || — || February 24, 2006 || Kitt Peak || Spacewatch || — || align=right | 1.9 km || 
|-id=892 bgcolor=#E9E9E9
| 380892 ||  || — || February 24, 2006 || Palomar || NEAT || JUN || align=right | 1.2 km || 
|-id=893 bgcolor=#C2FFFF
| 380893 ||  || — || February 24, 2006 || Kitt Peak || Spacewatch || L5 || align=right | 9.3 km || 
|-id=894 bgcolor=#E9E9E9
| 380894 ||  || — || February 24, 2006 || Kitt Peak || Spacewatch || — || align=right | 1.9 km || 
|-id=895 bgcolor=#E9E9E9
| 380895 ||  || — || January 31, 2006 || Kitt Peak || Spacewatch || AGN || align=right | 1.1 km || 
|-id=896 bgcolor=#E9E9E9
| 380896 ||  || — || February 26, 2006 || Anderson Mesa || LONEOS || — || align=right | 3.6 km || 
|-id=897 bgcolor=#E9E9E9
| 380897 ||  || — || February 27, 2006 || Mount Lemmon || Mount Lemmon Survey || — || align=right | 3.4 km || 
|-id=898 bgcolor=#E9E9E9
| 380898 ||  || — || February 27, 2006 || Kitt Peak || Spacewatch || 526 || align=right | 2.8 km || 
|-id=899 bgcolor=#E9E9E9
| 380899 ||  || — || February 27, 2006 || Kitt Peak || Spacewatch || JUN || align=right data-sort-value="0.93" | 930 m || 
|-id=900 bgcolor=#E9E9E9
| 380900 ||  || — || February 22, 2006 || Catalina || CSS || — || align=right | 2.0 km || 
|}

380901–381000 

|-bgcolor=#E9E9E9
| 380901 ||  || — || February 25, 2006 || Kitt Peak || Spacewatch || — || align=right | 2.4 km || 
|-id=902 bgcolor=#E9E9E9
| 380902 ||  || — || February 25, 2006 || Kitt Peak || Spacewatch || GEF || align=right | 3.2 km || 
|-id=903 bgcolor=#E9E9E9
| 380903 ||  || — || February 25, 2006 || Mount Lemmon || Mount Lemmon Survey || NEM || align=right | 2.2 km || 
|-id=904 bgcolor=#E9E9E9
| 380904 ||  || — || February 27, 2006 || Kitt Peak || Spacewatch || — || align=right | 2.4 km || 
|-id=905 bgcolor=#E9E9E9
| 380905 ||  || — || February 27, 2006 || Kitt Peak || Spacewatch || — || align=right | 2.7 km || 
|-id=906 bgcolor=#E9E9E9
| 380906 ||  || — || February 27, 2006 || Socorro || LINEAR || — || align=right | 2.4 km || 
|-id=907 bgcolor=#E9E9E9
| 380907 ||  || — || February 27, 2006 || Kitt Peak || Spacewatch || — || align=right | 3.3 km || 
|-id=908 bgcolor=#fefefe
| 380908 ||  || — || February 28, 2006 || Mount Lemmon || Mount Lemmon Survey || H || align=right data-sort-value="0.59" | 590 m || 
|-id=909 bgcolor=#E9E9E9
| 380909 ||  || — || February 20, 2006 || Catalina || CSS || — || align=right | 1.7 km || 
|-id=910 bgcolor=#E9E9E9
| 380910 ||  || — || February 28, 2006 || Mount Lemmon || Mount Lemmon Survey || — || align=right | 2.5 km || 
|-id=911 bgcolor=#E9E9E9
| 380911 ||  || — || February 25, 2006 || Kitt Peak || Spacewatch || — || align=right | 1.9 km || 
|-id=912 bgcolor=#E9E9E9
| 380912 ||  || — || March 2, 2006 || Kitt Peak || Spacewatch || AST || align=right | 1.5 km || 
|-id=913 bgcolor=#E9E9E9
| 380913 ||  || — || March 3, 2006 || Kitt Peak || Spacewatch || — || align=right | 1.9 km || 
|-id=914 bgcolor=#E9E9E9
| 380914 ||  || — || March 3, 2006 || Mount Lemmon || Mount Lemmon Survey || — || align=right | 1.2 km || 
|-id=915 bgcolor=#E9E9E9
| 380915 ||  || — || March 4, 2006 || Mount Lemmon || Mount Lemmon Survey || AST || align=right | 1.9 km || 
|-id=916 bgcolor=#E9E9E9
| 380916 ||  || — || March 2, 2006 || Kitt Peak || Spacewatch || HOF || align=right | 2.7 km || 
|-id=917 bgcolor=#d6d6d6
| 380917 ||  || — || March 3, 2006 || Kitt Peak || Spacewatch || 3:2 || align=right | 6.2 km || 
|-id=918 bgcolor=#d6d6d6
| 380918 ||  || — || March 23, 2006 || Mount Lemmon || Mount Lemmon Survey || — || align=right | 2.7 km || 
|-id=919 bgcolor=#d6d6d6
| 380919 ||  || — || March 24, 2006 || Mount Lemmon || Mount Lemmon Survey || CHA || align=right | 2.4 km || 
|-id=920 bgcolor=#d6d6d6
| 380920 ||  || — || March 29, 2006 || Socorro || LINEAR || EUP || align=right | 4.9 km || 
|-id=921 bgcolor=#E9E9E9
| 380921 ||  || — || April 2, 2006 || Kitt Peak || Spacewatch || — || align=right | 2.8 km || 
|-id=922 bgcolor=#E9E9E9
| 380922 ||  || — || April 2, 2006 || Kitt Peak || Spacewatch || — || align=right | 1.4 km || 
|-id=923 bgcolor=#E9E9E9
| 380923 ||  || — || April 2, 2006 || Kitt Peak || Spacewatch || — || align=right | 2.1 km || 
|-id=924 bgcolor=#E9E9E9
| 380924 ||  || — || April 7, 2006 || Catalina || CSS || — || align=right | 2.8 km || 
|-id=925 bgcolor=#E9E9E9
| 380925 ||  || — || April 2, 2006 || Kitt Peak || Spacewatch || — || align=right | 2.1 km || 
|-id=926 bgcolor=#E9E9E9
| 380926 ||  || — || April 17, 2006 || Mayhill || A. Lowe || GAL || align=right | 2.2 km || 
|-id=927 bgcolor=#E9E9E9
| 380927 ||  || — || April 18, 2006 || Palomar || NEAT || JUN || align=right | 1.6 km || 
|-id=928 bgcolor=#FA8072
| 380928 ||  || — || April 18, 2006 || Kitt Peak || Spacewatch || — || align=right data-sort-value="0.70" | 700 m || 
|-id=929 bgcolor=#FFC2E0
| 380929 ||  || — || April 25, 2006 || Catalina || CSS || APO || align=right data-sort-value="0.43" | 430 m || 
|-id=930 bgcolor=#d6d6d6
| 380930 ||  || — || April 20, 2006 || Lulin Observatory || Q.-z. Ye || — || align=right | 2.8 km || 
|-id=931 bgcolor=#d6d6d6
| 380931 ||  || — || April 22, 2006 || Siding Spring || SSS || — || align=right | 4.3 km || 
|-id=932 bgcolor=#d6d6d6
| 380932 ||  || — || April 25, 2006 || Kitt Peak || Spacewatch || NAE || align=right | 2.5 km || 
|-id=933 bgcolor=#d6d6d6
| 380933 ||  || — || April 25, 2006 || Kitt Peak || Spacewatch || CHA || align=right | 2.1 km || 
|-id=934 bgcolor=#d6d6d6
| 380934 ||  || — || April 25, 2006 || Kitt Peak || Spacewatch || — || align=right | 2.8 km || 
|-id=935 bgcolor=#d6d6d6
| 380935 ||  || — || April 26, 2006 || Kitt Peak || Spacewatch || — || align=right | 2.3 km || 
|-id=936 bgcolor=#E9E9E9
| 380936 ||  || — || April 30, 2006 || Kitt Peak || Spacewatch || — || align=right | 2.9 km || 
|-id=937 bgcolor=#d6d6d6
| 380937 ||  || — || May 1, 2006 || Kitt Peak || Spacewatch || CHA || align=right | 2.1 km || 
|-id=938 bgcolor=#d6d6d6
| 380938 ||  || — || May 3, 2006 || Kitt Peak || Spacewatch || — || align=right | 2.5 km || 
|-id=939 bgcolor=#d6d6d6
| 380939 ||  || — || April 25, 2006 || Kitt Peak || Spacewatch || — || align=right | 2.5 km || 
|-id=940 bgcolor=#d6d6d6
| 380940 ||  || — || April 24, 2006 || Kitt Peak || Spacewatch || KOR || align=right | 1.3 km || 
|-id=941 bgcolor=#d6d6d6
| 380941 ||  || — || May 7, 2006 || Kitt Peak || Spacewatch || URS || align=right | 4.5 km || 
|-id=942 bgcolor=#E9E9E9
| 380942 ||  || — || May 18, 2006 || Catalina || CSS || JUN || align=right | 1.5 km || 
|-id=943 bgcolor=#d6d6d6
| 380943 ||  || — || May 20, 2006 || Kitt Peak || Spacewatch || — || align=right | 4.1 km || 
|-id=944 bgcolor=#d6d6d6
| 380944 ||  || — || May 20, 2006 || Palomar || NEAT || BRA || align=right | 1.8 km || 
|-id=945 bgcolor=#d6d6d6
| 380945 ||  || — || May 20, 2006 || Catalina || CSS || — || align=right | 3.9 km || 
|-id=946 bgcolor=#E9E9E9
| 380946 ||  || — || May 20, 2006 || Kitt Peak || Spacewatch || — || align=right | 2.5 km || 
|-id=947 bgcolor=#E9E9E9
| 380947 ||  || — || May 20, 2006 || Kitt Peak || Spacewatch || GEF || align=right | 1.6 km || 
|-id=948 bgcolor=#d6d6d6
| 380948 ||  || — || May 19, 2006 || Palomar || NEAT || EUP || align=right | 4.2 km || 
|-id=949 bgcolor=#d6d6d6
| 380949 ||  || — || May 22, 2006 || Kitt Peak || Spacewatch || CHA || align=right | 2.0 km || 
|-id=950 bgcolor=#E9E9E9
| 380950 ||  || — || May 24, 2006 || Mount Lemmon || Mount Lemmon Survey || — || align=right | 2.5 km || 
|-id=951 bgcolor=#d6d6d6
| 380951 ||  || — || May 20, 2006 || Kitt Peak || Spacewatch || EMA || align=right | 3.1 km || 
|-id=952 bgcolor=#d6d6d6
| 380952 ||  || — || May 25, 2006 || Kitt Peak || Spacewatch || EOS || align=right | 2.6 km || 
|-id=953 bgcolor=#fefefe
| 380953 ||  || — || May 30, 2006 || Mount Lemmon || Mount Lemmon Survey || — || align=right data-sort-value="0.62" | 620 m || 
|-id=954 bgcolor=#FA8072
| 380954 ||  || — || May 30, 2006 || Mount Lemmon || Mount Lemmon Survey || — || align=right | 1.8 km || 
|-id=955 bgcolor=#d6d6d6
| 380955 ||  || — || April 21, 2006 || Kitt Peak || Spacewatch || — || align=right | 3.4 km || 
|-id=956 bgcolor=#fefefe
| 380956 ||  || — || August 13, 2006 || Palomar || NEAT || — || align=right data-sort-value="0.78" | 780 m || 
|-id=957 bgcolor=#d6d6d6
| 380957 ||  || — || August 13, 2006 || Palomar || NEAT || — || align=right | 4.0 km || 
|-id=958 bgcolor=#d6d6d6
| 380958 ||  || — || August 21, 2006 || Kitt Peak || Spacewatch || 7:4 || align=right | 2.9 km || 
|-id=959 bgcolor=#d6d6d6
| 380959 ||  || — || August 19, 2006 || Anderson Mesa || LONEOS || — || align=right | 4.3 km || 
|-id=960 bgcolor=#fefefe
| 380960 ||  || — || July 21, 2006 || Catalina || CSS || — || align=right data-sort-value="0.73" | 730 m || 
|-id=961 bgcolor=#fefefe
| 380961 ||  || — || August 17, 2006 || Palomar || NEAT || FLO || align=right data-sort-value="0.68" | 680 m || 
|-id=962 bgcolor=#fefefe
| 380962 ||  || — || August 17, 2006 || Palomar || NEAT || FLO || align=right data-sort-value="0.67" | 670 m || 
|-id=963 bgcolor=#FA8072
| 380963 ||  || — || August 19, 2006 || Palomar || NEAT || — || align=right data-sort-value="0.85" | 850 m || 
|-id=964 bgcolor=#d6d6d6
| 380964 ||  || — || August 21, 2006 || Kitt Peak || Spacewatch || — || align=right | 3.2 km || 
|-id=965 bgcolor=#fefefe
| 380965 ||  || — || August 27, 2006 || Anderson Mesa || LONEOS || — || align=right data-sort-value="0.70" | 700 m || 
|-id=966 bgcolor=#fefefe
| 380966 ||  || — || August 18, 2006 || Palomar || NEAT || FLO || align=right data-sort-value="0.64" | 640 m || 
|-id=967 bgcolor=#fefefe
| 380967 ||  || — || August 19, 2006 || Kitt Peak || Spacewatch || — || align=right data-sort-value="0.75" | 750 m || 
|-id=968 bgcolor=#fefefe
| 380968 ||  || — || September 12, 2006 || Catalina || CSS || — || align=right data-sort-value="0.85" | 850 m || 
|-id=969 bgcolor=#fefefe
| 380969 ||  || — || September 14, 2006 || Catalina || CSS || — || align=right data-sort-value="0.81" | 810 m || 
|-id=970 bgcolor=#fefefe
| 380970 ||  || — || September 15, 2006 || Kitt Peak || Spacewatch || — || align=right data-sort-value="0.60" | 600 m || 
|-id=971 bgcolor=#fefefe
| 380971 ||  || — || September 15, 2006 || Kitt Peak || Spacewatch || — || align=right data-sort-value="0.74" | 740 m || 
|-id=972 bgcolor=#d6d6d6
| 380972 ||  || — || September 15, 2006 || Kitt Peak || Spacewatch || — || align=right | 2.9 km || 
|-id=973 bgcolor=#fefefe
| 380973 ||  || — || September 18, 2006 || Kitt Peak || Spacewatch || — || align=right data-sort-value="0.78" | 780 m || 
|-id=974 bgcolor=#fefefe
| 380974 ||  || — || September 18, 2006 || Catalina || CSS || FLO || align=right data-sort-value="0.93" | 930 m || 
|-id=975 bgcolor=#fefefe
| 380975 ||  || — || August 29, 2006 || Kitt Peak || Spacewatch || FLO || align=right data-sort-value="0.50" | 500 m || 
|-id=976 bgcolor=#fefefe
| 380976 ||  || — || September 17, 2006 || Catalina || CSS || — || align=right data-sort-value="0.85" | 850 m || 
|-id=977 bgcolor=#fefefe
| 380977 ||  || — || September 18, 2006 || Anderson Mesa || LONEOS || — || align=right data-sort-value="0.79" | 790 m || 
|-id=978 bgcolor=#fefefe
| 380978 ||  || — || September 20, 2006 || La Sagra || OAM Obs. || — || align=right data-sort-value="0.68" | 680 m || 
|-id=979 bgcolor=#fefefe
| 380979 ||  || — || September 19, 2006 || Catalina || CSS || — || align=right data-sort-value="0.91" | 910 m || 
|-id=980 bgcolor=#FA8072
| 380980 ||  || — || September 20, 2006 || Catalina || CSS || — || align=right data-sort-value="0.85" | 850 m || 
|-id=981 bgcolor=#FFC2E0
| 380981 ||  || — || September 26, 2006 || Catalina || CSS || AMOPHA || align=right data-sort-value="0.62" | 620 m || 
|-id=982 bgcolor=#fefefe
| 380982 ||  || — || September 17, 2006 || Kitt Peak || Spacewatch || — || align=right data-sort-value="0.71" | 710 m || 
|-id=983 bgcolor=#fefefe
| 380983 ||  || — || September 20, 2006 || Catalina || CSS || — || align=right data-sort-value="0.92" | 920 m || 
|-id=984 bgcolor=#fefefe
| 380984 ||  || — || September 23, 2006 || Kitt Peak || Spacewatch || — || align=right data-sort-value="0.73" | 730 m || 
|-id=985 bgcolor=#fefefe
| 380985 ||  || — || September 18, 2006 || Catalina || CSS || — || align=right data-sort-value="0.74" | 740 m || 
|-id=986 bgcolor=#fefefe
| 380986 ||  || — || September 18, 2006 || Kitt Peak || Spacewatch || — || align=right data-sort-value="0.59" | 590 m || 
|-id=987 bgcolor=#fefefe
| 380987 ||  || — || September 27, 2006 || Mount Lemmon || Mount Lemmon Survey || FLO || align=right data-sort-value="0.79" | 790 m || 
|-id=988 bgcolor=#fefefe
| 380988 ||  || — || September 27, 2006 || Kitt Peak || Spacewatch || — || align=right data-sort-value="0.84" | 840 m || 
|-id=989 bgcolor=#fefefe
| 380989 ||  || — || September 27, 2006 || Kitt Peak || Spacewatch || — || align=right data-sort-value="0.56" | 560 m || 
|-id=990 bgcolor=#fefefe
| 380990 ||  || — || September 27, 2006 || Kitt Peak || Spacewatch || — || align=right | 1.0 km || 
|-id=991 bgcolor=#fefefe
| 380991 ||  || — || September 27, 2006 || Kitt Peak || Spacewatch || — || align=right data-sort-value="0.52" | 520 m || 
|-id=992 bgcolor=#fefefe
| 380992 ||  || — || September 28, 2006 || Mount Lemmon || Mount Lemmon Survey || — || align=right data-sort-value="0.76" | 760 m || 
|-id=993 bgcolor=#fefefe
| 380993 ||  || — || September 30, 2006 || Mount Lemmon || Mount Lemmon Survey || — || align=right data-sort-value="0.71" | 710 m || 
|-id=994 bgcolor=#fefefe
| 380994 ||  || — || September 19, 2006 || Catalina || CSS || PHO || align=right | 1.0 km || 
|-id=995 bgcolor=#fefefe
| 380995 ||  || — || September 28, 2006 || Mount Lemmon || Mount Lemmon Survey || — || align=right data-sort-value="0.77" | 770 m || 
|-id=996 bgcolor=#fefefe
| 380996 ||  || — || October 11, 2006 || Kitt Peak || Spacewatch || — || align=right | 1.1 km || 
|-id=997 bgcolor=#fefefe
| 380997 ||  || — || October 12, 2006 || Kitt Peak || Spacewatch || — || align=right data-sort-value="0.80" | 800 m || 
|-id=998 bgcolor=#fefefe
| 380998 ||  || — || October 12, 2006 || Kitt Peak || Spacewatch || — || align=right data-sort-value="0.63" | 630 m || 
|-id=999 bgcolor=#fefefe
| 380999 ||  || — || October 12, 2006 || Kitt Peak || Spacewatch || — || align=right data-sort-value="0.79" | 790 m || 
|-id=000 bgcolor=#fefefe
| 381000 ||  || — || October 15, 2006 || Catalina || CSS || FLO || align=right data-sort-value="0.77" | 770 m || 
|}

References

External links 
 Discovery Circumstances: Numbered Minor Planets (380001)–(385000) (IAU Minor Planet Center)

0380